= Gen (software) =

Application development environment marketed by CA Technologies

Gen is a Computer Aided Software Engineering (CASE) application development environment marketed by Broadcom Inc. Gen was previously known as CA Gen, IEF (Information Engineering Facility), Composer by IEF, Composer, COOL:Gen, Advantage:Gen and AllFusion Gen.

The toolset originally supported the information technology engineering methodology developed by Clive Finkelstein, James Martin and others in the early 1980s. Early versions supported IBM's DB2 database, 3270 'block mode' screens and generated COBOL code.

In the intervening years the toolset has been expanded to support additional development techniques such as component-based development; creation of client/server and web applications and generation of C, Java and C#. In addition, other platforms are now supported such as many variants of Unix-like Operating Systems (AIX, HP-UX, Solaris, Linux) as well as Windows.

Its range of supported database technologies have widened to include ORACLE, Microsoft SQL Server, ODBC, JDBC as well as the original DB2.

The toolset is fully integrated - objects identified during analysis carry forward into design without redefinition. All information is stored in a repository (central encyclopedia). The encyclopedia allows for large team development - controlling access so that multiple developers may not change the same object simultaneously.

== History ==
=== 1985-1997: Texas Instruments ===
It was initially produced by Texas Instruments, with input from James Martin and his consultancy firm James Martin Associates, and was based on the Information Engineering Methodology (IEM). The first version was launched in 1985.

IEF (Information Engineering Facility) became popular among large government departments and public utilities. It initially supported a CICS/COBOL/DB2 target environment. However, it now supports a wider range of relational databases and operating systems. IEF was intended to shield the developer from the complexities of building complete multi-tier cross-platform applications.

In 1995, Texas Instruments decided to change their marketing focus for the product. Part of this change included a new name - "Composer".

By 1996, IEF had become a popular tool. However, it was criticized by some IT professionals for being too restrictive, as well as for having a high per-workstation cost ($15K USD). But it is claimed that IEF reduces development time and costs by removing complexity and allowing rapid development of large scale enterprise transaction processing systems.

=== 1997-2000: Sterling Software ===
In 1997, Composer had another change of branding, Texas Instruments sold the Texas Instruments Software division, including the Composer rights, to Sterling Software. Sterling software changed the well known name "Information Engineering Facility" to "COOL:Gen". COOL was an acronym for "Common Object Oriented Language" - despite the fact that there was little object orientation in the product.

=== 2000-2018: Computer Associates ===
In 2000, Sterling Software was acquired by Computer Associates (now CA). CA has rebranded the product three times to date and the product is still used widely today. Under CA, recent releases of the tool added support for the CA-Datacom DBMS, the Linux operating system, C# code generation and ASP.NET web clients. The current version is known as CA Gen - version 8 being released in May 2010, with support for customised web services, and more of the toolset being based around the Eclipse framework.

=== 2018-current: Broadcom ===
As of 2020, CA Gen is owned and marketed by Broadcom Inc., which rebranded the product to Gen to avoid confusion with the former owner of the product.

There are a variety of "add-on" tools available for Gen, including GuardIEn - a Configuration Management and Developer Productivity Suite, QAT Wizard, an interview style wizard that takes advantage of the meta model in Gen, products for multi-platform application reporting and XML/SOAP enabling of Gen applications., and developer productivity tools such as Access Gen, APMConnect, QA Console and Upgrade Console from Response Systems

Version 8.6 of CA Gen came to market in June 2016.

Version 8.6.3 of CA Gen was released in 2021. Following this release, Broadcom have switched to a continuous delivery model with new features to be delivered as patches.
