= Girolami =

Girolami is an Italian surname. Notable people with the surname include:

- Ennio Girolami (1935–2013), Italian actor
- Gregory S. Girolami, American professor of chemistry
  - Girolami method
- Marino Girolami (1914–1994), Italian film director
- Mark Girolami (born 1963), British statistician and engineer
- Néstor Girolami (born 1989), Argentine racing driver
- Paul Girolami (1926–2023), British-Italian businessman
- Remigio dei Girolami (1235–1319), Italian Dominican theologian
