= Bob Pepper =

Bob Pepper may refer to:

- Bob Pepper (baseball)
- Bob Pepper (illustrator)

== See also ==
- Robert Pepper, American specialist in communications policy
- Robert H. Pepper, United States Marine Corps general
