= Density =

Mass per unit volume

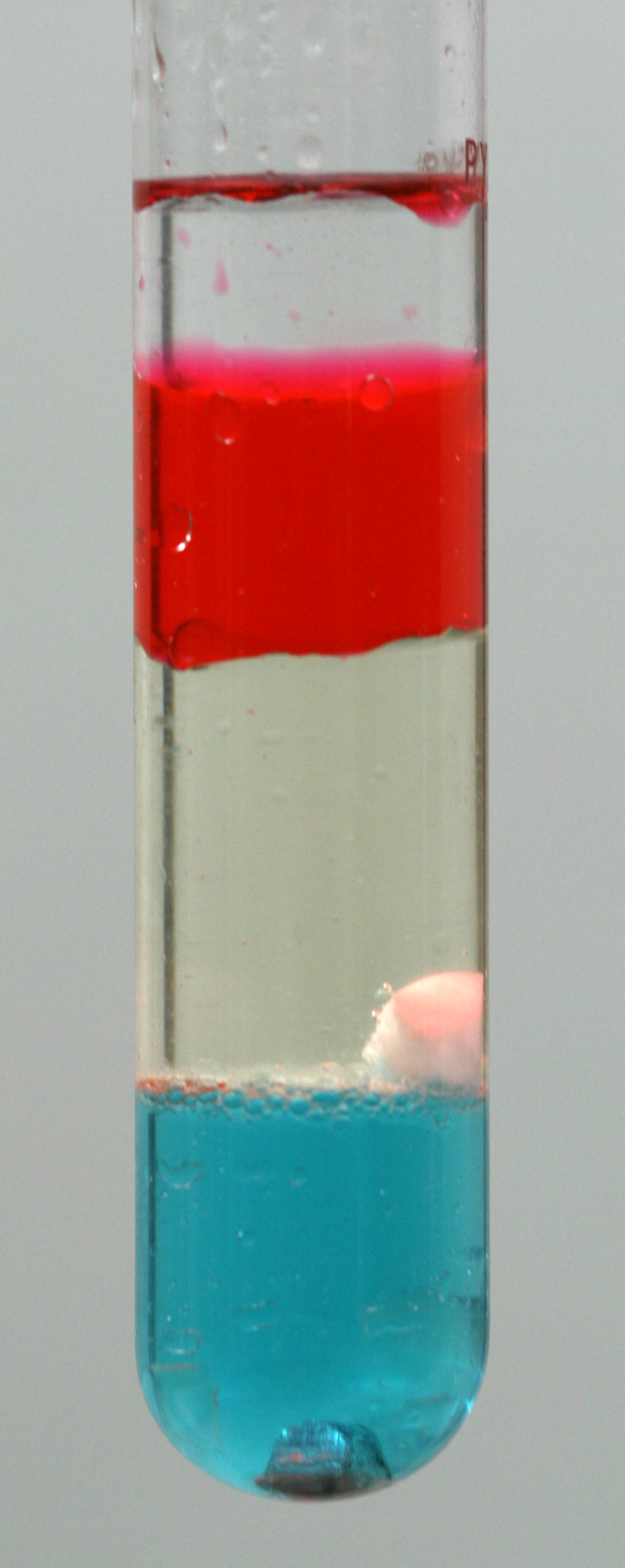
- A test tube holding four non-miscible colored liquids with different densities
- Common symbols: ρ, D, d
- SI unit: kg/m^{3}
- Other units: g/cm^{3}
- Extensive?: No
- Intensive?: Yes
- Conserved?: No
- Derivations from other quantities: $\rho = \frac{m}{V}$
- Dimension: $\mathsf{L}^{-3} \mathsf{M}$

Density (volumetric mass density or specific mass) is the ratio of a substance's mass to its volume. The symbol most often used for density is ρ (the lower case Greek letter rho), although the Latin letter D (or d) can also be used:
$$\rho = \frac{m}{V},$$
where ρ is the density, m is the mass, and V is the volume. In some cases (for instance, in the United States oil and gas industry), density is loosely defined as its weight per unit volume, although this is scientifically inaccurate – this quantity is more specifically called specific weight.

For a pure substance, the density is equal to its mass concentration. Different materials usually have different densities, and density may be relevant to buoyancy, purity and packaging. Osmium is the densest known element at standard conditions for temperature and pressure.

To simplify comparisons of density across different systems of units, it is sometimes replaced by the dimensionless quantity "relative density" or "specific gravity", i.e. the ratio of the density of the material to that of a standard material, usually water. Thus a relative density less than one relative to water means that the substance floats in water.

The density of a material varies with temperature and pressure. This variation is typically small for solids and liquids but much greater for gases. Increasing the pressure on an object decreases the volume of the object and thus increases its density. Increasing the temperature of a substance while maintaining a constant pressure decreases its density by increasing its volume (with a few exceptions). In most fluids, heating the bottom of the fluid results in convection due to the decrease in the density of the heated fluid, which causes it to rise relative to denser unheated material.

The reciprocal of the density of a substance is occasionally called its specific volume, a term sometimes used in thermodynamics. Density is an intensive property in that increasing the amount of a substance does not increase its density; rather it increases its mass.

Other conceptually comparable quantities or ratios include specific density, relative density (specific gravity), and specific weight.

The concept of mass density is generalized in the International System of Quantities to volumic quantities, the quotient of any physical quantity and volume, such as charge density or volumic electric charge.

== History ==
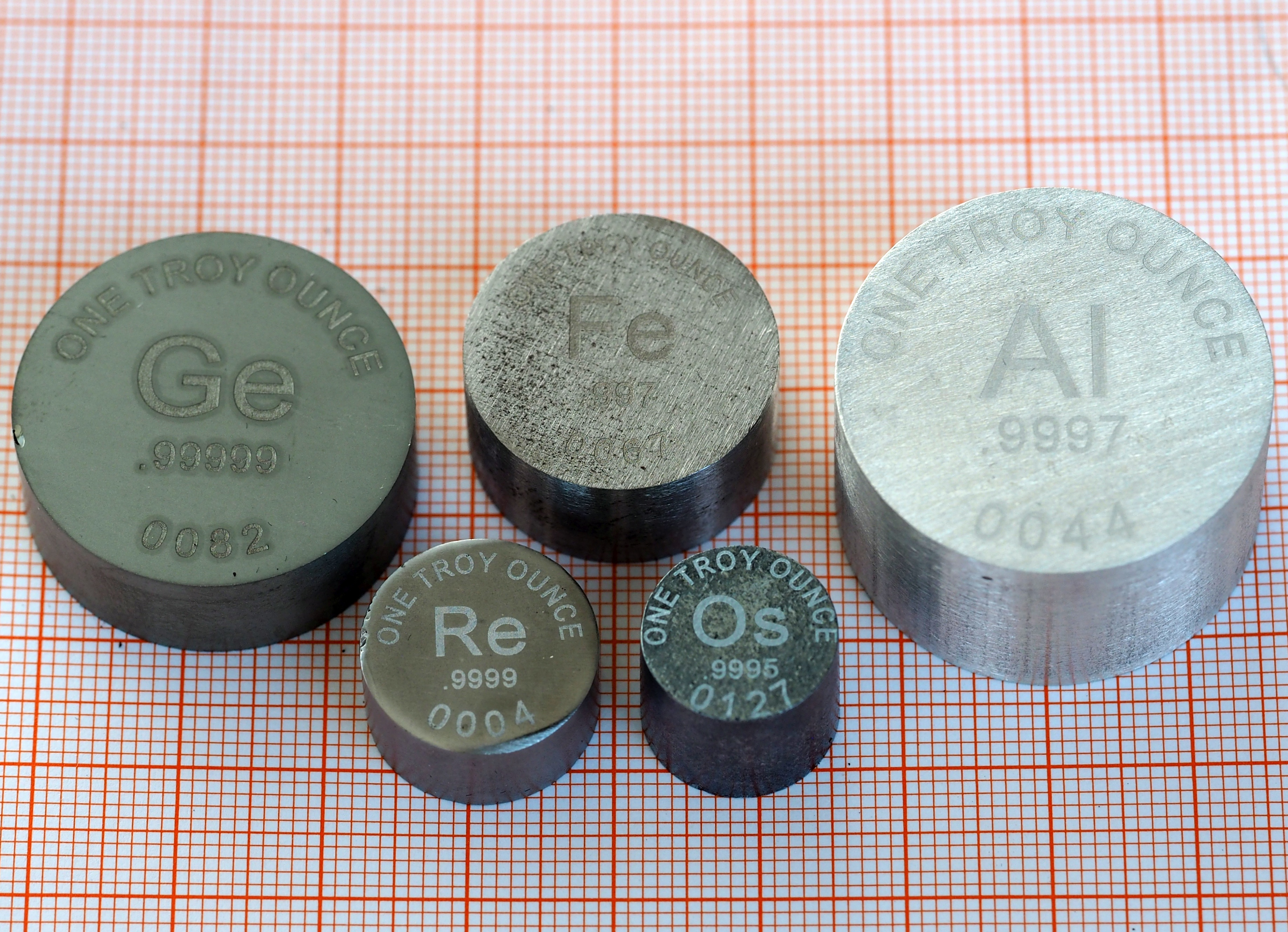
One-troy-ounce (480 gr; 31 g) samples of germanium, iron, aluminium, rhenium and osmium. The differences in size are due to differences in density.

=== Density, floating, and sinking ===
The understanding that different materials have different densities, and of a relationship between density, floating, and sinking must date to prehistoric times. Much later it was put in writing. Aristotle, for example, wrote:

There is so great a difference in density between salt and fresh water that vessels laden with cargoes of the same weight almost sink in rivers, but ride quite easily at sea and are quite seaworthy. And an ignorance of this has sometimes cost people dear who load their ships in rivers. The following is a proof that the density of a fluid is greater when a substance is mixed with it. If you make water very salt by mixing salt in with it, eggs will float on it. ... If there were any truth in the stories they tell about the lake in Palestine it would further bear out what I say. For they say if you bind a man or beast and throw him into it he floats and does not sink beneath the surface.

— Aristotle, Meteorologica, Book II, Chapter III

=== Volume vs. density; volume of an irregular shape ===
In a well-known but probably apocryphal tale, Archimedes was given the task of determining whether King Hiero's goldsmith was embezzling gold during the manufacture of a golden wreath dedicated to the gods and replacing it with another, cheaper alloy. Archimedes knew that the irregularly shaped wreath could be crushed into a cube whose volume could be calculated easily and compared with the mass; but the king did not approve of this. Baffled, Archimedes is said to have taken an immersion bath and observed from the rise of the water upon entering that he could calculate the volume of the gold wreath through the displacement of the water. Upon this discovery, he leapt from his bath and ran naked through the streets shouting, "Eureka! Eureka!" (Ancient Greek: Εύρηκα!, lit. 'I have found it'). As a result, the term eureka entered common parlance and is used today to indicate a moment of enlightenment.

The story first appeared in written form in Vitruvius' books of architecture, two centuries after it supposedly took place. Some scholars have doubted the accuracy of this tale, saying among other things that the method would have required precise measurements that would have been difficult to make at the time.

Nevertheless, in 1586, Galileo Galilei, in one of his first experiments, made a possible reconstruction of how the experiment could have been performed with ancient Greek resources.

== Units ==
From the equation for density (ρ = m/V), mass density has any unit that is mass divided by volume. As there are many units of mass and volume covering many different magnitudes there are a large number of units for mass density in use. The SI unit of kilogram per cubic metre (kg/m^{3}) and the cgs unit of gram per cubic centimetre (g/cm^{3}) are probably the most commonly used units for density. In industry, other larger or smaller units of mass and or volume are often more practical and US customary units may be used. See below for a list of some of the most common units of density.

Densities using the following metric units all have exactly the same numerical value, one-thousandth of the value in kg/m^{3}. Liquid water has a density of about 1 g/cm^{3} or 1000 kg/m^{3}, making any of these SI units numerically convenient to use as most solids and liquids have densities between 0.1 and 20 g/cm^{3}.

- gram per cubic centimetre (g/cm^{3})
- kilogram per cubic decimetre (kg/dm^{3})
- megagram per cubic metre (Mg/m^{3})

Units employing the metric units litre and tonne (metric ton), which are not part of the SI, include:

- gram per millilitre (g/mL)
- kilogram per litre (kg/L)
- tonne per cubic metre (t/m^{3})

In US customary units density can be stated in:

- Avoirdupois ounce per cubic inch (1 g/cm^{3} ≈ 0.578036672 oz/cu in)
- Avoirdupois ounce per fluid ounce (1 g/cm^{3} ≈ 1.04317556 oz/US fl oz = 1.04317556 lb/US fl pint)
- Avoirdupois pound per cubic inch (1 g/cm^{3} ≈ 0.036127292 lb/cu in)
- pound per cubic foot (1 g/cm^{3} ≈ 62.427961 lb/cu ft)
- pound per cubic yard (1 g/cm^{3} ≈ 1685.5549 lb/cu yd)
- pound per US liquid gallon (1 g/cm^{3} ≈ 8.34540445 lb/US gal)
- pound per US bushel (1 g/cm^{3} ≈ 77.6888513 lb/bu)
- slug per cubic foot

Imperial units differing from the above (as the Imperial gallon and bushel differ from the US units) in practice are rarely used, though found in older documents. The Imperial gallon was based on the concept that an Imperial fluid ounce of water would have a mass of one Avoirdupois ounce, and indeed 1 g/cm^{3} ≈ 1.00224129 ounces per Imperial fluid ounce = 10.0224129 pounds per Imperial gallon. The density of precious metals could conceivably be based on Troy ounces and pounds, a possible cause of confusion.

The density of a crystalline material and be calculated from its formula mass (in daltons) and the volume of its unit cell, the density can be calculated. One dalton per cubic ångström is equal to a density of 1.66053906892(52) g/cm^{3}, based on the 2022 CODATA recommended value of the dalton.

== Measurement ==
A number of techniques as well as standards exist for the measurement of density of materials. Such techniques include the use of a hydrometer (a buoyancy method for liquids), hydrostatic weighing (a buoyancy method for liquids and solids), immersed body method (a buoyancy method for liquids), pycnometer (liquids and solids), air comparison pycnometer (solids), oscillating U-tube (liquids), as well as pour and tap (solids). However, each individual method or technique measures different types of density (e.g. bulk density, skeletal density, etc.), and therefore it is necessary to have an understanding of the type of density being measured as well as the type of material in question.

=== Homogeneous materials ===
The density at all points of a homogeneous object equals its total mass divided by its total volume. The mass is normally measured with a scale or balance; the volume may be measured directly (from the geometry of the object) or by the displacement of a fluid. To determine the density of a liquid or a gas, a hydrometer, a dasymeter or a Coriolis flow meter may be used, respectively. Similarly, hydrostatic weighing uses the displacement of water due to a submerged object to determine the density of the object.

=== Heterogeneous materials ===
If the body is not homogeneous, then its density varies between different regions of the object. In that case the density around any given location is determined by calculating the density of a small volume around that location. In the limit of an infinitesimal volume the density of an inhomogeneous object at a point becomes: $\rho(\vec{r}) = \mathrm{d}m / \mathrm{d}V$, where $\mathrm{d}V$ is an elementary volume at position $\vec r$. The mass of the body then can be expressed as
$$m = \int_V \rho(\vec{r})\,\mathrm{d}V.$$

=== Non-compact materials ===
In practice, bulk materials such as sugar, sand, or snow contain voids. Many materials exist in nature as flakes, pellets, or granules.

Voids are regions which contain something other than the considered material. Commonly the void is air, but it could also be vacuum, liquid, solid, or a different gas or gaseous mixture.

The bulk volume of a material—inclusive of the void space fraction—is often obtained by a simple measurement (e.g. with a calibrated measuring cup) or geometrically from known dimensions.

Mass divided by bulk volume determines bulk density. This is not the same thing as the material volumetric mass density. To determine the material volumetric mass density, one must first discount the volume of the void fraction. Sometimes this can be determined by geometrical reasoning. For the close-packing of equal spheres the non-void fraction can be at most about 74%. It can also be determined empirically. Some bulk materials, however, such as sand, have a variable void fraction which depends on how the material is agitated or poured. It might be loose or compact, with more or less air space depending on handling.

In practice, the void fraction is not necessarily air, or even gaseous. In the case of sand, it could be water, which can be advantageous for measurement as the void fraction for sand saturated in water—once any air bubbles are thoroughly driven out—is potentially more consistent than dry sand measured with an air void.

In the case of non-compact materials, one must also take care in determining the mass of the material sample. If the material is under pressure (commonly ambient air pressure at the earth's surface) the determination of mass from a measured sample weight might need to account for buoyancy effects due to the density of the void constituent, depending on how the measurement was conducted. In the case of dry sand, sand is so much denser than air that the buoyancy effect is commonly neglected (less than one part in one thousand).

Mass change upon displacing one void material with another while maintaining constant volume can be used to estimate the void fraction, if the difference in density of the two voids materials is reliably known.

== Changes of density ==
In general, density can be changed by changing either the pressure or the temperature. Increasing the pressure always increases the density of a material. Increasing the temperature generally decreases the density, but there are notable exceptions to this generalization. For example, the density of water increases between its melting point at 0 °C and 4 °C; similar behavior is observed in silicon at low temperatures.

The effect of pressure and temperature on the densities of liquids and solids is small. The compressibility for a typical liquid or solid is 10^{−6} bar^{−1} (1 bar = 0.1 MPa) and a typical thermal expansivity is 10^{−5} K^{−1}. This roughly translates into needing around ten thousand times atmospheric pressure to reduce the volume of a substance by one percent. (Although the pressures needed may be around a thousand times smaller for sandy soil and some clays.) A one percent expansion of volume typically requires a temperature increase on the order of thousands of degrees Celsius.

In contrast, the density of gases is strongly affected by pressure. The density of an ideal gas is
$$\rho = \frac {MP}{RT},$$
where M is the molar mass, P is the pressure, R is the universal gas constant, and T is the absolute temperature. This means that the density of an ideal gas can be doubled by doubling the pressure, or by halving the absolute temperature.

In the case of volumic thermal expansion at constant pressure and small intervals of temperature the temperature dependence of density is
$$\rho = \frac{\rho_{T_0}}{1 + \alpha \cdot \Delta T},$$
where $\rho_{T_0}$ is the density at a reference temperature, $\alpha$ is the thermal expansion coefficient of the material at temperatures close to $T_0$.

== Density of solutions ==
The density of a solution is the sum of mass (massic) concentrations of the components of that solution.

Mass (massic) concentration of each given component $\rho_i$ in a solution sums to density of the solution,
$$\rho = \sum_i \rho_i .$$

Expressed as a function of the densities of pure components of the mixture and their volume participation, it allows the determination of excess molar volumes:
$$\rho = \sum_i \rho_i \frac{V_i}{V}\, = \sum_i \rho_i \varphi_i = \sum_i \rho_i \frac{V_i}{\sum_i V_i + \sum_i {V^E}_i},$$
provided that there is no interaction between the components.

Knowing the relation between excess volumes and activity coefficients of the components, one can determine the activity coefficients:
$$\overline{V^E}_i = RT \frac{\partial\ln\gamma_i}{\partial P}.$$

== List of densities ==
=== Various materials ===
Densities of various materials covering a range of values
| Material | ρ (kg/m^{3}) (Note: Unless otherwise noted, all densities given are at standard conditions for temperature and pressure, that is, 273.15 K (0.00 °C) and 100 kPa (0.987 atm).) | Notes |
|---|---|---|
| Hydrogen | 0.0898 | |
| Helium | 0.179 | |
| Aerographite | 0.2 | (Note: Air contained in material excluded when calculating density) |
| Metallic microlattice | 0.9 | |
| Aerogel | 1.0 | |
| Air | 1.2 | At sea level |
| Tungsten hexafluoride | 12.4 | One of the heaviest known gases at standard conditions |
| Liquid hydrogen | 70 | At approximately −255 °C |
| Styrofoam | 75 | Approximate |
| Cork | 240 | Approximate |
| Pine | 373 | |
| Lithium | 535 | Least dense metal |
| Wood | 700 | Seasoned, typical |
| Oak | 710 | |
| Potassium | 860 | |
| Ice | 916.7 | At temperature < 0 °C |
| Cooking oil | 910–930 | |
| Sodium | 970 | |
| Water (fresh) | 1,000 | Maximum, occurs at approximately 4 °C |
| Water (salt) | 1,030 | Salinity of 3% |
| Liquid oxygen | 1,141 | At approximately −219 °C |
| Nylon | 1,150 | |
| Plastics | 1,175 | Approximate; for polypropylene and PETE/PVC |
| Glycerol | 1,261 | |
| Tetrachloroethene | 1,622 | |
| Sand | 1,600 | Between 1,600 and 2,000 |
| Magnesium | 1,740 | |
| Beryllium | 1,850 | |
| Silicon | 2,330 | |
| Concrete | 2,400 | |
| Glass | 2,500 | |
| Quartzite | 2,600 | |
| Granite | 2,700 | |
| Gneiss | 2,700 | |
| Aluminium | 2,700 | |
| Limestone | 2,750 | Compact |
| Basalt | 3,000 | |
| Diiodomethane | 3,325 | Liquid at room temperature |
| Diamond | 3,500 | |
| Titanium | 4,540 | |
| Selenium | 4,800 | |
| Vanadium | 6,100 | |
| Antimony | 6,690 | |
| Zinc | 7,000 | |
| Chromium | 7,200 | |
| Tin | 7,310 | |
| Manganese | 7,325 | Approximate |
| Mild steel | 7,850 | |
| Iron | 7,870 | |
| Niobium | 8,570 | |
| Brass | 8,600 | |
| Cadmium | 8,650 | |
| Cobalt | 8,900 | |
| Nickel | 8,900 | |
| Copper | 8,940 | |
| Bismuth | 9,750 | |
| Molybdenum | 10,220 | |
| Silver | 10,500 | |
| Lead | 11,340 | |
| Thorium | 11,700 | |
| Rhodium | 12,410 | |
| Mercury | 13,546 | |
| Tantalum | 16,600 | |
| Uranium | 19,100 | |
| Tungsten | 19,300 | |
| Gold | 19,320 | |
| Plutonium | 19,840 | |
| Rhenium | 21,020 | |
| Platinum | 21,450 | |
| Iridium | 22,420 | |
| Osmium | 22,570 | Densest natural element on Earth |

=== Others ===
| Entity | ρ (kg/m^{3}) | Notes |
|---|---|---|
| Interstellar medium | 1.7×10^{−26} | Based on 10^{−5} hydrogen atoms per cubic centimetre |
| Local Interstellar Cloud | 5×10^{−22} | Based on 0.3 hydrogen atoms per cubic centimetre |
| Interstellar medium | 1.7×10^{−16} | Based on 10^{5} hydrogen atoms per cubic centimetre |
| The Earth | 5,515 | Mean density. |
| Earth's inner core | 13,000 | Approx., as listed in Earth. |
| The core of the Sun | 33,000–160,000 | Approx. |
| White dwarf star | 2.1×10^{9} | Approx. |
| Atomic nuclei | 2.3×10^{17} | Does not depend strongly on size of nucleus |
| Neutron star | 1×10^{18} | |
| Planck density | 5.155×10^{96} | |

=== Water ===
Density of liquid water at 1 atm pressure
| Temp. (°C) (Note: Values below 0 °C refer to supercooled water.) | Density (kg/m^{3}) | |
|---|---|---|
| −30 | 983 | .854 |
| −20 | 993 | .547 |
| −10 | 998 | .117 |
| 0 | 999 | .8395 |
| 4 | 999 | .9720 |
| 10 | 999 | .7026 |
| 15 | 999 | .1026 |
| 20 | 998 | .2071 |
| 22 | 997 | .7735 |
| 25 | 997 | .0479 |
| 30 | 995 | .6502 |
| 40 | 992 | .2 |
| 60 | 983 | .2 |
| 80 | 971 | .8 |
| 100 | 958 | .4 |

=== Air ===
Air density vs. temperature

Density of air at 1 atm pressure
| T (°C) | ρ (kg/m^{3}) |
|---|---|
| −25 | 1.423 |
| −20 | 1.395 |
| −15 | 1.368 |
| −10 | 1.342 |
| −5 | 1.316 |
| 0 | 1.293 |
| 5 | 1.269 |
| 10 | 1.247 |
| 15 | 1.225 |
| 20 | 1.204 |
| 25 | 1.184 |
| 30 | 1.164 |
| 35 | 1.146 |

=== Molar volumes of liquid and solid phase of elements ===
Molar volumes of liquid and solid phase of elements

== Generalization: volumic quantities ==
The qualifier volumic is recommended in the International System of Quantities (ISO 80000-1) to denote the quotient of any physical quantity by volume. The expressions "per unit volume" or "volume ... density" (or simply "density") are also often used, with resulting units involving reciprocal cubic metre (m^{−3}), for example:

- mass density or volumic mass
- charge density or volumic electric charge, the electric charge per volume
- number density or volumic number, the number of entities per unit volume
- activity density or volumic activity
- energy density, potential energy per unit volume
- force density, force per unit volume
- power density, power per unit volume

== See also ==
- Densities of the elements (data page)
- List of elements by density
- Air density
- Area density
- Bulk density
- Buoyancy
- Charge density
- Density current
- Density gradient
- Density prediction by the Girolami method
- Dord
- Energy density
- Lighter than air
- Linear density
- Number density
- Orthobaric density
- Paper density
- Specific weight
- Spice (oceanography)
- Standard temperature and pressure
