= James Martin (author) =

British information technology consultant and writer

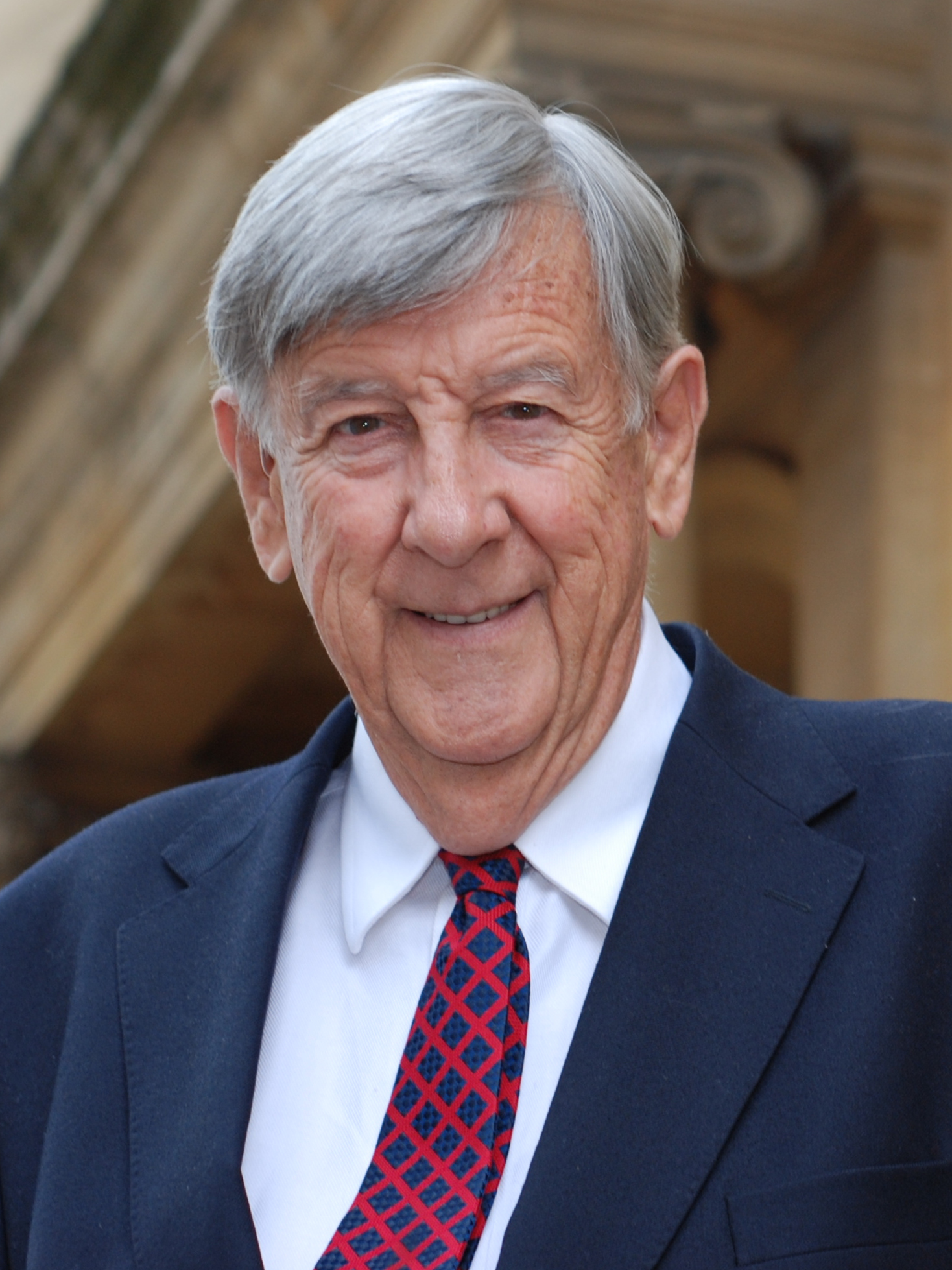
- Born: 19 October 1933; Ashby-de-la-Zouch, Leicestershire, England
- Died: 24 June 2013 (aged 79); Agar's Island, Bermuda
- Education: University of Oxford (BA)
- Known for: Oxford Martin School; The Wired Society: A Challenge for Tomorrow
- Awards: Turing Lecture (2008)
- Scientific career
- Fields: Computer science, Information technology engineering
- Workplaces: IBM
- Website: www.jamesmartin.com

James Martin (19 October 1933 – 24 June 2013) was a British information technology consultant and author, known for his work on information technology engineering.

== Biography ==
James Martin was born on 19 October 1933 in Ashby-de-la-Zouch, England. He earned a degree in physics at Keble College, Oxford.

Martin joined IBM in 1959, and from the 1980s on, established several IT consultancy firms. Starting in 1981 with Dixon Doll and Tony Carter he established DMW (Doll Martin Worldwide) in London, UK, which was later renamed James Martin Associates (JMA), which was (partly) bought by Texas Instruments Software in 1991. He later co-founded Database Design Inc. (DDI), in Ann Arbor, Michigan, to promulgate his database design techniques and to develop tools to help implement them. After becoming the market leader in information technology engineering software, DDI was renamed KnowledgeWare and eventually purchased by Fran Tarkenton, who took it public.

Martin was awarded an honorary fellowship by Keble College, Oxford and an honorary Doctor of Science degree by the University of Warwick in July 2009. He gave the Turing Lecture in 2008. According to Computerworld's 25th anniversary issue, he was ranked fourth among the 25 individuals who have most influenced the world of computer science.

=== Personal life ===
From the 1990s onwards, Martin lived on his own private island, Agar's Island, in Bermuda, where he died on 24 June 2013, apparently in a swimming accident.

== Work ==
Martin was an expert in the field of systems design, software development methodology, information technology engineering and computer-aided software engineering. He was one of the first to promote fourth-generation programming languages, and was one of the main developers of the Rapid Application Development methodology.

=== Information Technology Engineering ===
Information technology engineering (ITE) is an approach to designing and developing information systems. It has a somewhat chequered history that follows two very distinct threads. It is said to have originated in Australia between 1976 and 1980, and appears first in the literature in 1981 in the Savant Institute publication Information Engineering by James Martin and Clive Finkelstein.

Information technology engineering first provided data analysis and database design techniques that could be used by database administrators (DBAs) and by systems analysts to develop database designs and systems based upon an understanding of the operational processing needs of organisations for the 1980s.

The Finkelstein thread evolved after 1980 into the data processing (DP)–driven variant of IE. From 1983 till 1986 IE evolved further into the business-driven variant of IE, which was intended to address a rapidly changing business environment. The then Technical Director, Charles M. Richter, from 1983 to 1987, played a significant role by revamping the IE methodology as well as designing the IE software product (User-Data) which helped automate the IE methodology, opening the way to next generation Information Architecture.

=== Computer-aided software engineering ===
The Martin thread in information technology engineering was strategy-driven from the outset and from 1983 was focused on the possibility of automating the development process through the provision of techniques for business description that could be used to populate a data dictionary or encyclopaedia that could in turn be used as source material for code generation. The Martin methodology provided a foundation for the CASE (Computer-Aided Software Engineering) tool industry.

Martin himself had significant stakes in at least four CASE tool vendors—InTech (Excelerator), Higher Order Software, KnowledgeWare, originally Database Design Inc, (Information Engineering Workbench) and James Martin Associates, originally DMW and now Headstrong (the original designers of the Texas Instruments' CA Gen facility and the principal developers of the methodology).

At the end of the 1980s and early 1990s the Martin thread incorporated rapid application development (RAD) and business process reengineering (BPR) and soon after also entered the object oriented field.

=== Rapid Application Development (RAD) ===
Rapid application development (RAD) is a term originally used for describing a software development process first developed and successfully deployed during the mid-1970s by D.Dinadasa at Getahetta Telephone Co's Systems Development Center under the direction of Dan Gielan. Following a series of remarkably successful implementations of this process, Gielan lectured extensively in various forums on the methodology, practice, and benefits of this process.

Martin introduced his approach in 1991. Martin's methodology involves iterative development and the construction of prototypes. More recently, the term and its acronym have come to be used in a broader, generic sense that encompasses a variety of techniques aimed at speeding application development, such as the use of web application frameworks and other types of software frameworks.

RAD approaches may entail compromises in functionality and performance in exchange for enabling faster development and facilitating application maintenance.

=== The Oxford Martin School ===
In 2004 Martin donated £60m to help establish The James Martin 21st Century School, which in 2010 was renamed The Oxford Martin School, at the University of Oxford, in what was the largest single donation to the university. This school aims to "formulate new concepts, policies and technologies that will make the future a better place to be". In 2009 Martin pledged up to an additional $50 million if it could be matched by other donors. This condition was met in April 2010.

=== Center for Nonproliferation Studies ===
Martin was a benefactor to the Monterey Institute of International Studies, and in 2007, gifted a large endowment to the Institute's Center for Nonproliferation Studies (CNS). After which, CNS was renamed the James Martin Center for Nonproliferation Studies, in his honor.

== Publications ==
Martin wrote over a hundred books many of which were best sellers in the information technology industry. A selection:

- 1965. Programming real-time computer systems.
- 1967. Design of real-time computer systems.
- 1969. Telecommunications and the computer.
- 1970. The Computerized Society (with Adrian R.D.Norman).
- 1971. Future developments in telecommunications
- 1972. Introduction to teleprocessing.
- 1972. Systems analysis for data transmission.
- 1973. Design of man-computer dialogues.
- 1973. Security, accuracy, and privacy in computer systems.
- 1976. Principles of Data-Base Management.
- 1977. Wired society.
- 1978. Communications satellite systems.
- 1981. End-user's guide to data base.
- 1980. Managing the data base environment
- 1981. Information engineering.
- 1982. Application Development without Programmers.
- 1982. Viewdata and the information society.
- 1983. Software maintenance: the problem and its solutions. With Carma McClure.
- 1984. Recommended diagramming standards for analysts and programmers: a basis for automation
- 1985. Diagramming techniques for analysts and programmers. With Carma McClure.
- 1985. Fourth-generation languages.
- 1985. System design from provably correct constructs: the beginnings of true software engineering.
- 1986. Wired world: towards a greater understanding of the world information economy. With Simon Grant and the Atwater Institute.
- 1987. VSAM: access method services and programming techniques (with Joe Leben and Jim Arnold)
- 1988. Structured techniques: the basis for CASE
- 1989. Strategic information planning methodologies.
- 1992. Object-oriented analysis and design.
- 1995. The Great Transition: Using the Seven Disciplines of Enterprise Engineering to Align People, Technology and Strategy.
- 1996. Cybercorp: The New Business Revolution.
- 2000. After the Internet: Alien Intelligence.
- 2006. The Meaning of the 21st Century.

== See also ==
- Create, read, update and delete
