= Danielle Belgrave =

Trinidadian-British computer scientist

- Born: Danielle Charlotte Belgrave
- Education: London School of Economics (BSc); University College London (MSc); University of Manchester (PhD)
- Scientific career
- Fields: Statistics; Machine learning
- Workplaces: DeepMind; Microsoft Research; Imperial College London; GlaxoSmithKline
- Thesis: Probabilistic causal models for asthma and allergies developing in childhood (2014)
- Doctoral advisor: Iain Buchan; Christopher Bishop; Adnan Custovic
- Website: microsoft.com/en-us/research/people/dabelgra

Danielle Charlotte Belgrave is a Trinidadian-British computer scientist whose research uses machine learning to understand disease progression and healthcare personalisation. She is VP of AI/ML at GSK where she heads the AI/ML Clinical Development Team. She was previously tenured at DeepMind, Microsoft Research and Imperial College.

== Early life and education ==
Belgrave grew up in Trinidad and Tobago, where her high school mathematics teacher inspired her to work as a data scientist. She studied mathematics and statistics at the London School of Economics (LSE). She was a graduate student at University College London (UCL), where she earned a master's degree in statistics. In 2010 Belgrave moved to the University of Manchester, where she earned a PhD for research supervised by Iain Buchan, Christopher Bishop and Adnan Custovic supported by a Microsoft Research scholarship. She was awarded a Dorothy Hodgkin postgraduate award by Microsoft and the Barry Kay Award by the British Society of Allergy and Clinical Immunology (BSACI).

== Research and career ==
After graduating, Belgrave worked at GlaxoSmithKline (GSK), where she was awarded the Exceptional Scientist Award. Belgrave joined Imperial College London as faculty after receiving a research fellowship award from the Medical Research Council (MRC) in 2015. She develops statistical machine learning models to look at disease progression in an effort to design new management strategies and understand heterogeneity. Statistical learning methods can inform the management of medical conditions by providing a framework for endotype discovery using probabilistic modelling. She uses statistical models to identify the underlying endotypes of a condition from a set of phenotypes.

She studied whether atopic march, the progression of allergic diseases from early life, adequately describes atopic diseases like eczema in early life. Belgrave used a latent disease profile model to study atopic march in over 9,000 children, where machine learning was used to identify groups of children with similar eczema onset patterns. She is part of the study team for early life asthma research consortium. Belgrave is interested in using big data for meaningful clinical interpretation, to inform personalized prevention strategies.

Her research focuses on Bayesian and statistical machine learning within healthcare to develop personalized medicine. As of 2019 Belgrave is developing and implementing methods which incorporate domain knowledge with data-driven models. Her early research interests include latent variable models, longitudinal studies, survival analysis, 'omics, dimensionality reduction and Probabilistic graphical models.

Belgrave is part of the regulatory algorithms project, which evaluates how healthcare algorithms should be regulated. In particular, Belgrave is interested in what scheme of liability should be imposed on artificial intelligence for healthcare. She served on the organizing committee of the Conference on Neural Information Processing Systems in 2019, 2020, 2022, 2024, and 2025. She was General Chair of NeurIPS 2025 and is a member of the NeurIPS Board.
