= Turing Talk =

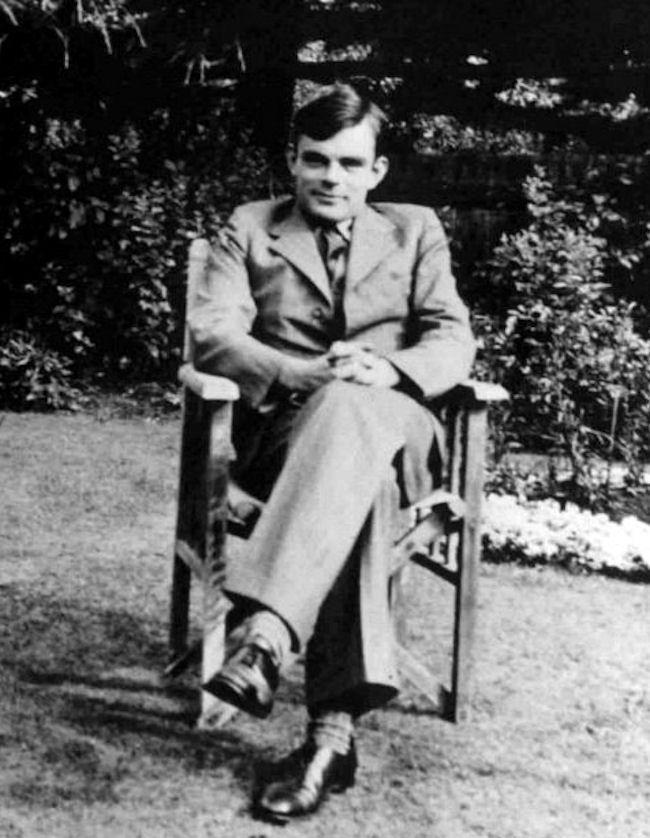
- The Turing Talk is named in honour of Alan Turing, often considered the father of Computer Science
- Sponsored by: Institution of Engineering and Technology (IET); British Computer Society (BCS)
- Date: 1998
- Location: London; Manchester; Cardiff; Belfast; Glasgow
- Country: United Kingdom
- Website: www.bcs.org/events-home/turing-talk

The Turing Talk, previously known as the Turing Lecture, is an annual award lecture delivered by a noted speaker on the subject of Computer Science. Sponsored and co-hosted by the Institution of Engineering and Technology (IET) and the British Computer Society, the talk has been delivered at different locations in the United Kingdom annually since 1999. Venues for the talk have included Savoy Place, the Royal Institution in London, Cardiff University, The University of Manchester, Belfast City Hall and the University of Glasgow. The main talk is preluded with an insightful speaker, who performs an opening act for the main event.

The talk is named in honour of Alan Turing and should not be confused with the Turing Award lecture organised by the Association for Computing Machinery (ACM). Recent Turing talks are available as a live webcast and archived online.

== Turing Talks ==
Previous speakers have included:

- 2022: Julie McCann, a day in the life of a smart city
- 2021: Cecilia Mascolo, Sounding out wearable and audio data for health diagnostics
- 2020: Mark Girolami, Digital Twins: The Next Phase of the AI Revolution
- 2019: Krishna Gummadi Engineering a fair future: Why we need to train unbiased AI
- 2018: Andy Harter, Innovation and technology – art or science?
- 2017: Guruduth Banavar, Beneficial AI for the Advancement of Humankind
- 2016: Robert Schukai, The Internet of Me: It's all about my screens
- 2015: Robert Pepper, The Internet Paradox: How bottom-up beat(s) command and control
- 2014: Bernard S. Meyerson, Beyond silicon: Cognition and much, much more
- 2013: Suranga Chandratillake, What they didn't teach me: building a technology company and taking it to market
- 2012: Ray Dolan, From cryptoanalysis to cognitive neuroscience – a hidden legacy of Alan Turing
- 2011: Donald Knuth, An Evening with Donald Knuth – All Questions Answered
- 2010: Christopher Bishop. Embracing Uncertainty: the new machine intelligence
- 2009: Mike Brady, Information Engineering and its Future
- 2008: James Martin, Target Earth and the meaning of the 21st century
- 2007: Grady Booch, The Promise, the Limits and the Beauty of Software
- 2006: Chris Mairs, Lifestyle access for the disabled
- 2005: Fred Brooks, Collaboration and Telecollaboration in Design
- 2004: Fred Piper, Cyberspace Security, The Good, The Bad & The Ugly
- 2003: Caroline Kovac, Computing in the Age of the Genome
- 2002: Mark Welland, Smaller, faster, better – but is it nanotechnology?
- 2001: Nick Donofrio, Technology, Innovation and the New Economy
- 2000: Brian Randell, Facing up to Faults
- 1999: Samson Abramsky From Computation to Interaction – Towards a Science of Information

== See also ==
- Pinkerton Lecture
