= The Fourth Paradigm =

2009 anthology of essays on the topic of data science

The Fourth Paradigm: Data-intensive Scientific Discovery
- Editors: Tony Hey, Kristin Michele Tolle, Stewart Tansley
- Subject: Data science
- Publisher: Microsoft Research
- Publication date: 1 October 2009
- ISBN: 978-0-9825442-0-4
- Website: https://www.microsoft.com/en-us/research/publication/fourth-paradigm-data-intensive-scientific-discovery/

The Fourth Paradigm: Data-intensive Scientific Discovery is a 2009 anthology of essays on the topic of data science. Editors Tony Hey, Kristin Michele Tolle, and Stewart Tansley claim in the book's description that it presents the first broad look at the way that increasing use of data is bringing a paradigm shift to the nature of science.

== Response ==
A review in The New York Times starts by explaining that the fourth paradigm is data science, and that paradigms one to three are, in order, empirical evidence, scientific theory, and computational science.

A commentator who agreed with the premise that data would change science questioned the history of this development, suggesting that computer scientists would have to develop better user interfaces to facilitate scientific discovery.

A commentator specializing in discussions about R claimed that as R and similar tools adapt to handle more data more easily the changes which the book describes will manifest more thoroughly.

A researcher credited the book as inspiration for examining the color of snow.

== Further resources ==
The book's editors describe the text.

- "Tony Hey, Chief Data Scientist of the Science and Technology Facilities Council of the UK". YouTube. The Digital Future. 7 June 2016..
- Tolle, Kristin M.; Tansley, D. Stewart W.; Hey, Anthony J. G. (August 2011). "The Fourth Paradigm: Data-Intensive Scientific Discovery [Point of View]". Proceedings of the IEEE. 99 (8): 1334–1337. doi:10.1109/JPROC.2011.2155130.
- Hey, Tony (2012). "The Fourth Paradigm – Data-Intensive Scientific Discovery" (PDF). E-Science and Information Management. Communications in Computer and Information Science. Vol. 317. p. 1. doi:10.1007/978-3-642-33299-9_1. ISBN 978-3-642-33298-2. ISSN 1865-0929. S2CID 37174890.
- Hey, Tony (24 July 2017). "Jisc futures: our 'painfully slow' progress towards the goal of open science". Times Higher Education.
