= Tony Hey =

British physicist and computer scientist

Tony Hey CBE FREng FIET FInstP FBCS
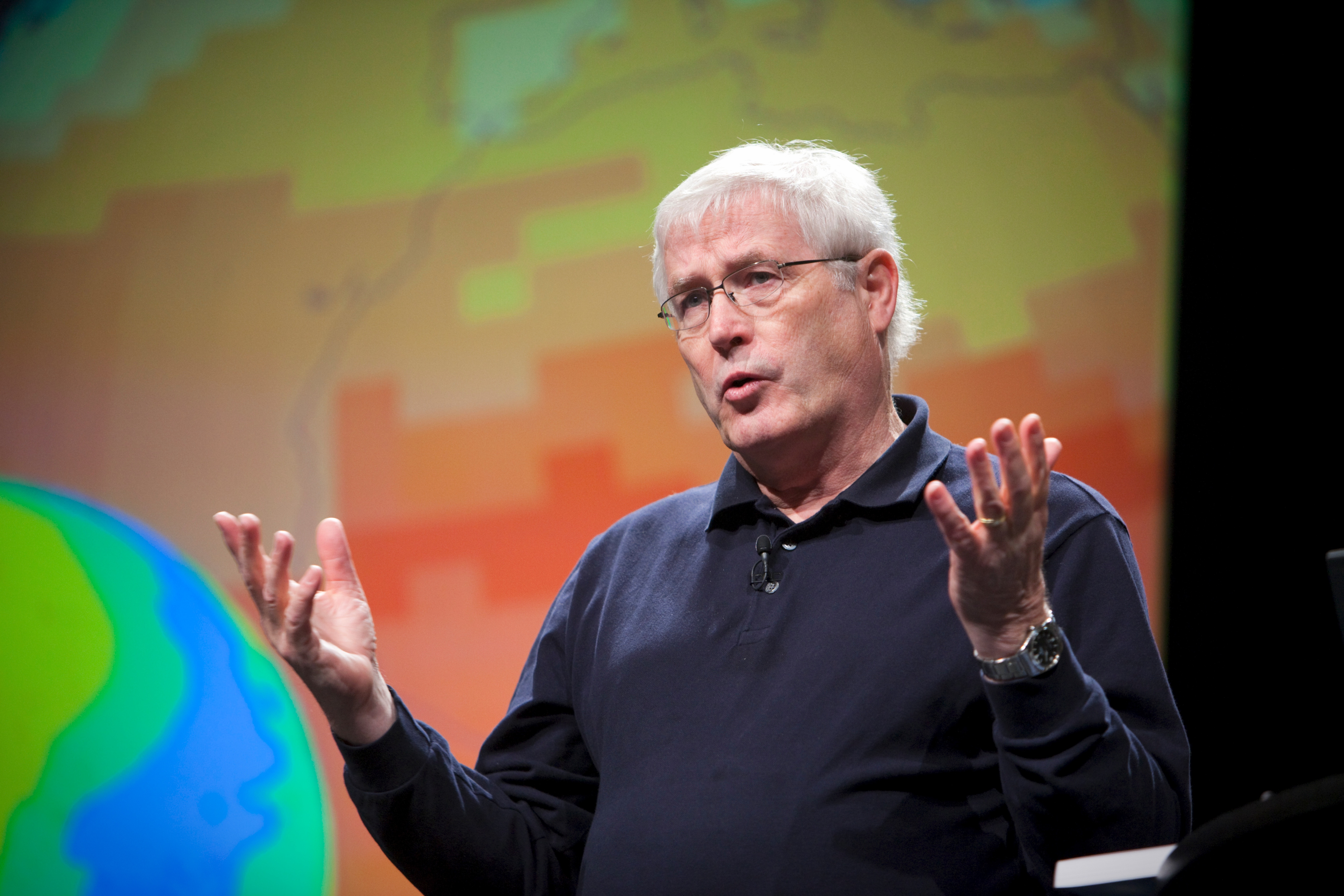
- Tony Hey talking at Pop!Tech 2009
- Born: Anthony John Grenville Hey; 17 August 1946 (age 80); England, UK
- Education: King Edward's School, Birmingham
- Alma mater: University of Oxford (BA, DPhil)
- Awards: ACM Fellow (2017); Pinkerton Lecture (2006)
- Scientific career
- Fields: Parallel computing; e-Science; High performance computing (HPC)
- Workplaces: University of Southampton; Microsoft Research; Caltech; CERN; Inmos; University of Oxford; Science and Technology Facilities Council
- Thesis: Polarization in electron-proton scattering (1970)
- Doctoral advisor: P. K. Kabir

Anthony John Grenville Hey (born 17 August 1946) was vice-president of Microsoft Research Connections, a division of Microsoft Research, until his departure in 2014.

== Education ==
Hey was educated at King Edward's School, Birmingham and the University of Oxford. He graduated with a Bachelor of Arts degree in physics in 1967, and a Doctor of Philosophy in theoretical physics in 1970 supervised by P. K. Kabir. He was a student of Worcester College, Oxford and St John's College, Oxford.

== Career and research ==
From 1970 through 1972, Hey was a postdoctoral fellow at California Institute of Technology (Caltech). Moving to Pasadena, California, he worked with Richard Feynman and Murray Gell-Mann, both winners of the Nobel Prize in Physics. He then moved to Geneva, Switzerland and worked as a fellow at CERN (the European organisation for nuclear research) for two years. Hey worked about thirty years as an academic at University of Southampton, starting in 1974 as a particle physicist. He spent 1978 as a visiting fellow at Massachusetts Institute of Technology. In 1981, he returned to Caltech as a visiting research professor. There he learned of Carver Mead's work on very-large-scale integration and become interested in applying parallel computing techniques to large-scale scientific simulations.

Hey worked with British semiconductor company Inmos on the Transputer project in the 1980s. He switched to computer science in 1985, and in 1986 became professor of computation in the department of electronics and computer science at Southampton. While there, he was promoted to head of the school of electronics and computer science in 1994 and dean of engineering and applied science in 1999. Among his work was "doing research on Unix with tools like LaTeX." In 1990 he was a visiting fellow at the Thomas J. Watson Research Center of IBM Research. He then worked with Jack Dongarra, Rolf Hempel and David Walker, to define the Message Passing Interface (MPI) which became a de facto open standard for parallel scientific computing. In 1998 he was a visiting research fellow at Los Alamos National Laboratory in the USA.

Hey led the UK's e-Science Programme from March 2001 to June 2005. He was appointed corporate vice-president of technical computing at Microsoft on 27 June 2005. Later he became corporate vice-president of external research, and in 2011 corporate vice-president of Microsoft Research Connections until his departure in 2014.

Since 2015, Hey has held the position of Chief Data Scientist at the UK's Science and Technology Facilities Council, and is a Senior Data Science Fellow at the University of Washington eScience Institute.

Hey is the editor of the journal Concurrency and Computation: Practice and Experience. Among other scientific advisory boards in Europe and the United States, he is a member of the Global Grid Forum (GGF) Advisory Committee.

=== Publications ===
Hey has authored or co-authored a number of books including The Fourth Paradigm: Data-Intensive Scientific Discovery, The Quantum Universe,The New Quantum Universe, The Feynman Lectures on Computation and Einstein's Mirror. Hey has also authored numerous peer-reviewed journal papers. His latest book is a popular book on computer science called The Computing Universe: A Journey through a Revolution.

=== Awards and honours ===
Hey had an open scholarship to Worcester College, Oxford, from 1963 to 1967, won the Scott Prize for Physics in 1967, senior scholarship to St John's College, Oxford, in 1968 and was a Harkness Fellow from 1970 through 1972. Hey was made a Commander of the Order of the British Empire (CBE) in 2005. He was elected a Fellow of the British Computer Society (FBCS) in 1996, the Institute of Physics (FInstP) and the Institution of Electrical Engineers in 1996 and the Royal Academy of Engineering (FREng) in 2001. In 2006, he presented the IET Pinkerton Lecture. In 2007, he was awarded an honorary Doctor of Civil Law degree from Newcastle University. In 2017, he was elected a Fellow of the Association for Computing Machinery (ACM).
