= Julie McCann =

British computer scientist

Julie McCann CEng FBCS
- Born: Julie Ann McCann
- Education: Ulster University (BSc, PhD)
- Awards: Suffrage Science award (2018); Turing Talk (2022)
- Scientific career
- Fields: Sensor networks Internet of things Wireless communications Cyber-physical systems Smart dust
- Workplaces: City, University of London; Imperial College London
- Thesis: A Fine Grained Database System Performance Model (1992)
- Website: www.imperial.ac.uk/people/j.mccann

Julie Ann McCann is a Northern Irish computer scientist who is a professor at Imperial College London. She is the leader of the Adaptive Emergent Systems Engineering. She is a Fellow of the British Computer Society and was awarded the Suffrage Science award in 2018.

== Early life and education ==
As a teenager, McCann became interested in electronic music, particularly listening to Kraftwerk and Karlheinz Stockhausen. She lived close to the Armagh Planetarium in Armagh. She joined Ulster University for her academic studies, working toward a bachelor's and doctorate in computer science. She completed her doctorate in 1992.

== Research and career ==
McCann develops spatial computing and wireless communications, which combine information from their environments with their digital components. Her group investigate convergence and anarchical spatial computing systems. To better understand this, she uses established understanding from systems beyond computing infrastructure (e.g. economics, biology, physics). She combines decentralised algorithms and protocols using low-powered sensing devices. These devices are very small and communicate with one another via radio signals.

McCann joined Imperial College London in 2002 from City, University of London. She works on Adaptive Emergent Systems Engineering. Her interests lie in harnessing the various interactions between the cyber and physical to improve performance, resilience and to make secure. She oversees the Alan Turing Institute Resilient and Robust Infrastructure challenge.

McCann leads the National Research Foundation Singapore Eco Cities initiative. McCann also serves as deputy director of the PETRAS National Centre of Excellence.

=== Awards and honours ===
- 2018 Suffrage Science award
- 2022 Turing Talk

=== Selected publications ===
Her publications include:

- Huebscher, Markus C.; McCann, Julie A. (13 August 2008). "A survey of autonomic computing—degrees, models, and applications". ACM Computing Surveys. 40 (3): 7:1–7:28. doi:10.1145/1380584.1380585. hdl:10044/1/5738. ISSN 0360-0300. S2CID 8914588.
- Sheng, Zhengguo; Yang, Shusen; Yu, Yifan; Vasilakos, Athanasios V.; Mccann, Julie A.; Leung, Kin K. (2013). "A survey on the IETF protocol suite for the internet of things: standards, challenges, and opportunities". IEEE Wireless Communications. 20 (6): 91–98. doi:10.1109/MWC.2013.6704479. ISSN 1558-0687. S2CID 11017278.
- Cai, Yunlong; Qin, Zhijin; Cui, Fangyu; Li, Geoffrey Ye; McCann, Julie A. (2018). "Modulation and Multiple Access for 5G Networks". IEEE Communications Surveys and Tutorials. 20 (1): 629–646. arXiv:1702.07673. doi:10.1109/COMST.2017.2766698. ISSN 1553-877X. S2CID 3548474.
