= Pinkerton Lecture =

The Pinkerton lecture series is held by the Institution of Engineering and Technology in commemoration and honour of John Pinkerton, the pivotal engineer who was involved with designing the UK's first business computer in 1951. The first lecture was held in 2000 and the event has taken place every year since then.

== The Lecturers ==
- 2000 Maurice Wilkes
- 2001 David Caminer
- 2002 David Cleevely
- 2004 Hermann Hauser
- 2005 Subhash Bhatnagar
- 2006 Tony Hey
- 2007 Tim Berners-Lee
- 2008 Alex Balfour
- 2009 John Carey
- 2010 Steve Furber
- 2011 Mike Short
- 2012 Kevin Warwick
- 2013 Robin Saxby
- 2014 Jim Morrish
- 2015 Robert Pepper

== See also ==
- Turing Talk
