= Robin Saxby =

English engineer

Sir Robin Saxby FREng HonFRS
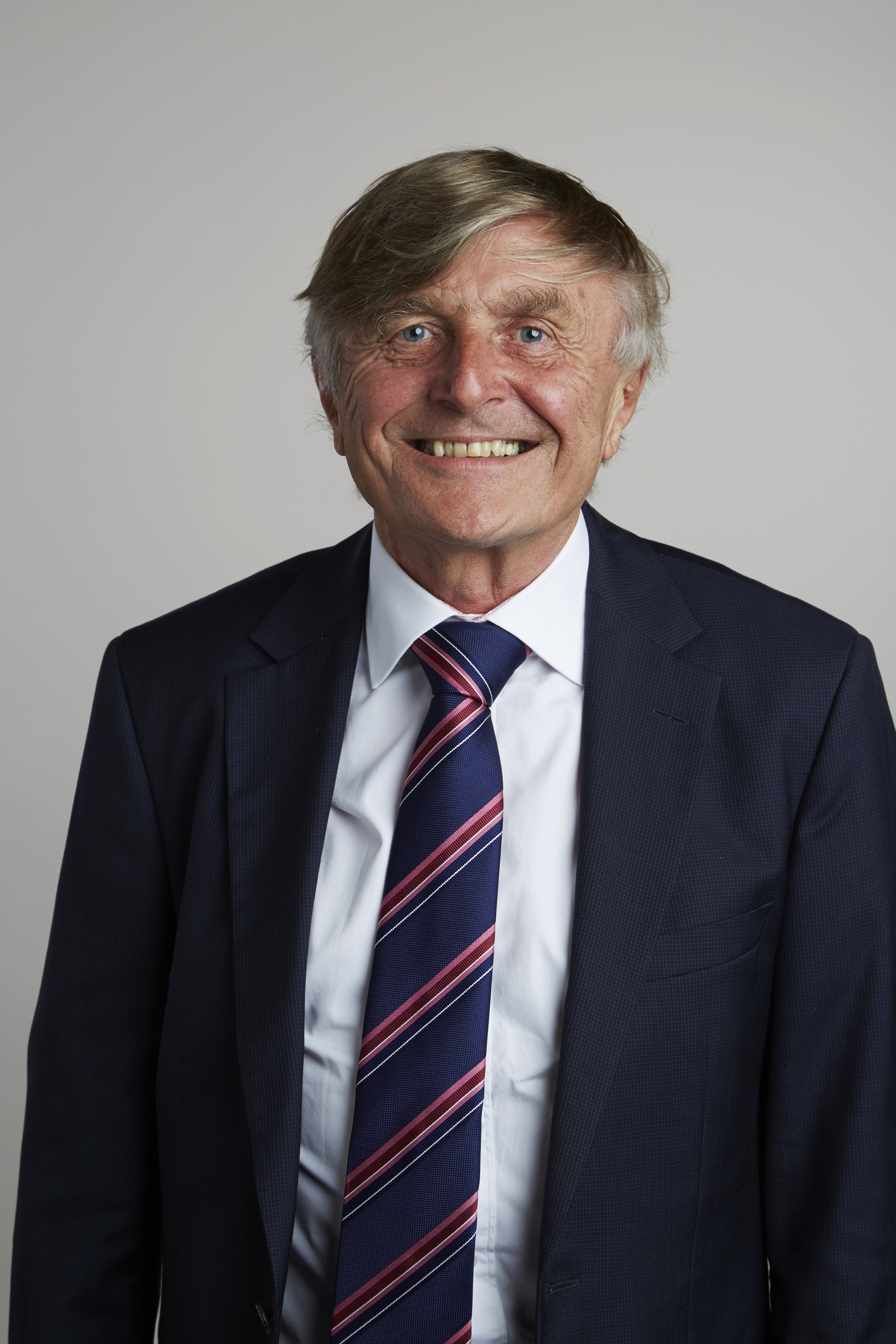
- Robin Saxby in 2015, portrait via the Royal Society
- Born: Robin Keith Saxby; 4 February 1947 (age 79); Chesterfield, Derbyshire
- Education: University of Liverpool (BEng)
- Spouse: Patricia Bell (m. 1970)
- Awards: Knight Bachelor (2002); FREng (2002); HonFRS (2015); IEEE Founders Medal (2019)
- Scientific career
- Workplaces: ARM Holdings; Rank Bush Murphy; Pye Ltd.; Motorola; Henderson Security; European Silicon Structures

Sir Robin Keith Saxby (born 4 February 1947) is an English engineer who was chief executive and then chairman of ARM Holdings, which he built to become a dominant supplier of embedded systems.

== Early life and education ==
Saxby was born in 1947 in Derbyshire and was educated at Chesterfield Grammar School, a boys' grammar school. He attended the University of Liverpool, where he gained a Bachelor of Engineering degree in Electronics in 1968.

== Career ==
Saxby had an electronics kit at the age of eight and a television repair business at the age of 14. Reflecting on this in 2006, he considered himself "destined for the electronics industry". He worked at Rank Bush Murphy, Pye, Motorola and Henderson Security. Immediately prior to his appointment at ARM, he worked at European Silicon Structures.

In 1991 he joined Cambridge-based ARM as their first chief executive officer (CEO) and built it to "a global giant" with offices round the world. He was chief executive from 1991 to 2001, and subsequently chairman from 2001 to 2006. When he was appointed CEO in 1991, he took 12 engineers from Acorn Computers into the newly formed joint venture between Acorn and Apple Inc, with a $1.5 million investment from Apple. Saxby introduced the licensing model for selling microprocessors, which led to a 95% market share in the mobile phone sector. Arm is now into the world's most successful processor company, with over 50 billion units shipped to date. During his 10 years as CEO, ARM became the most valuable company in the Cambridge cluster, with a market capitalisation of over $10bn. ARM under his leadership became a global company with offices in many countries and licences taken by all significant semiconductor companies in the world.

Since his retirement from ARM, he has become a promoter of young entrepreneurs and is involved in a number of start-up companies which he supports with advice and finance.

== Honours and awards ==
Saxby is a chartered engineer, an honorary fellow of the IET and a fellow of the Royal Academy of Engineering. He has honorary doctorates from the University of Liverpool (where he is a visiting professor), Loughborough University, the University of Essex, Nottingham Trent University and Anglia Ruskin University.

He received the Faraday Medal of the IEE (now the IET). He was knighted in the 2002 New Year Honours List. He became president of the IET on 1 October 2006 and stepped down on 30 September 2007. In 2013 he presented the IET prestigious Pinkerton Lecture at the Infosys auditorium in Bangalore, India. He was president of the Old Cestrefeldians Society 2012/13. Saxby was elected an Honorary Fellow of the Royal Society (FRS) in 2015.

Saxby received the 2019 IEEE Founders Medal “For achievements in developing a globally successful electronics enterprise with an innovative approach to licensing of Intellectual Property.”

== Personal life ==
Saxby married Patricia Bell in 1970. They have a son and a daughter.

Professional and academic associations
Preceded by Sir John Chisholm	President of the Institution of Engineering and Technology; 2006–2007	Succeeded by John Loughhead
