= Caroline Kovac =

American chemist

- Born: Caroline Ann Kovic
- Education: University of Southern California
- Awards: Turing Talk (2003)
- Scientific career
- Workplaces: IBM; Burill & Company
- Thesis: The stereochemistry and mechanism of the polymerizaton of butadiene by coordination catalysts (1981)

Caroline Ann Kovac is an American chemist, technologist, executive, and consultant.

Kovac initiated the computational life sciences division at IBM in 1999. She retired from IBM in 2007, having grown the division to over 1500 people globally.

== Education ==
By Kovac's own account, she was "one of the first" in her family to attend and graduate from university, receiving a bachelor's degree in chemistry from Oberlin College. She obtained a Ph.D. in chemistry from the University of Southern California in 1981.

== Career ==
From 1981 to 1983, Kovac was employed as a chemist working on carbon-based materials. Kovac was employed at IBM from 1983 to 2002. She initially entered the company as a bench chemist, specializing in fine-contact metallurgy, packaging, and mainframe computer components at the San Jose Research laboratory (later IBM Almaden). Kovac would later take roles in various other segments of IBM, to include manufacturing, supply-chain management, software, and multiple stints in IBM Research. She was named VP of Research from 1997 to 2000.

In 2004, the New York Times profiled Kovac's division as it ventured into distributed computing power to solve structures for the Human Proteome Folding Project. She was also a founding member of the National Geographic Genographic Project to track human migration across the centuries using DNA sequencing and data analysis.

Kovac is a member-emerita of the IBM Academy of Technology.

== Awards ==
- 2004 - Forbes '50 Most Powerful Women in Business'
- 2003 - Stevie Award finalist, Best CEO or COO
- 2003 - Turing Talk from the British Computer Society
- 2002 - Women in Technology Hall of Fame inductee
