= Orthobaric density =

The orthobaric density of a compound is the density of coexisting phases (liquid, gas, or solid) at a given temperature.

== Liquid - Gas Equilibrium ==
For any temperature below the critical point, the density of the gas will be less than that of the liquid. At the critical point, the density of the liquid and gas phases are identical and the compound becomes a supercritical fluid.
