= Christopher Bishop =

British computer scientist (born 1959)

Christopher Bishop FRS FRSE FREng
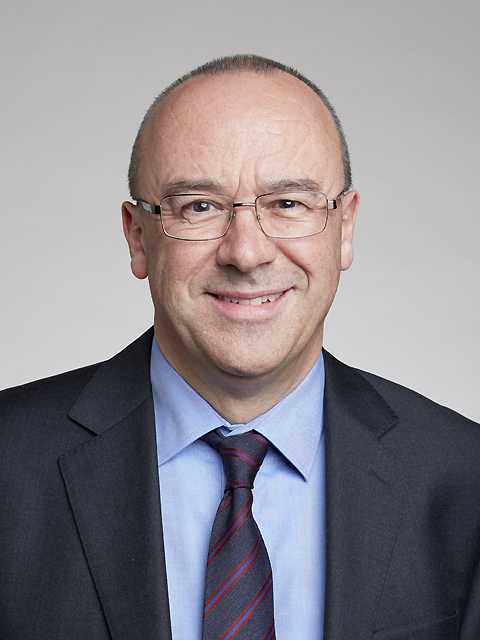
- Bishop in 2017
- Born: 7 April 1959 (age 67); Norwich, England
- Education: Earlham School; St Catherine's College, Oxford (BA); University of Edinburgh (PhD)
- Known for: Pattern Recognition and Machine Learning (PRML) book
- Spouse: Jennifer Morris (m. 1988)
- Children: 2
- Awards: Royal Institution Christmas Lectures (2008); Turing Lecture (2010)
- Scientific career
- Fields: Machine learning
- Workplaces: University of Oxford; Culham Centre for Fusion Energy; AEA Technology; Aston University; University of Edinburgh; Microsoft Research
- Thesis: The semi-classical technique in field theory: some applications (1983)
- Doctoral advisor: Peter Higgs; David Wallace
- Doctoral students: Neil Lawrence; Danielle Belgrave
- Website: www.microsoft.com/en-us/research/people/cmbishop/

Christopher Michael Bishop (born 7 April 1959) is a British computer scientist. He is a Microsoft technical fellow and director of Microsoft Research AI4Science. He is also honorary professor of computer science at the University of Edinburgh, and a fellow of Darwin College, Cambridge. Bishop was a founding member of the UK AI Council, and in 2019 he was appointed to the prime minister's Council for Science and Technology.

== Early life and education ==
Christopher Michael Bishop was born on 7 April 1959 in Norwich, England, to Leonard and Joyce Bishop. He was educated at Earlham School in Norwich, and obtained a Bachelor of Arts degree in physics from St Catherine's College, Oxford, and later a PhD in theoretical physics from the University of Edinburgh, with a thesis on quantum field theory supervised by David Wallace and Peter Higgs.

== Research and career ==
Bishop investigates machine learning, in which computers are made to learn from data and experience. His former doctoral students include Neil Lawrence and Danielle Belgrave.

=== Publications ===
Bishop is the author of two highly cited and widely adopted machine learning text books: Neural Networks for Pattern Recognition and Pattern Recognition and Machine Learning. His latest book, Deep Learning, Foundations and Concepts, was published in 2023 by Springer.

=== Awards and honours ===
Bishop was awarded the Tam Dalyell prize in 2009 and the Rooke Medal from the Royal Academy of Engineering in 2011. He gave the Royal Institution Christmas Lectures in 2008 and the Turing Lecture in 2010. Bishop was elected a Fellow of the Royal Academy of Engineering (FREng) in 2004, a Fellow of the Royal Society of Edinburgh (FRSE) in 2007, and Fellow of the Royal Society (FRS) in 2017.

== Personal life ==
Bishop married Jennifer Mary Morris in 1988. They have two sons.
