= Mark Girolami =

British civil engineer and statistician (born 1963)

Mark Girolami FREng FRSE
- Born: August 29, 1963 (age 63); Irvine, North Ayrshire
- Education: University of Glasgow (BSc); University of Paisley (PhD)
- Awards: Turing Talk (2020); Royal Society Wolfson Research Merit Award (2012)
- Scientific career
- Workplaces: IBM; University of Glasgow; University College London; University of Warwick; Imperial College London; University of Cambridge
- Thesis: Self-organising neural networks for signal separation (1997)
- Doctoral advisor: Colin Fyfe
- Website: www.eng.cam.ac.uk/profiles/mag92

Mark A. Girolami (born 1963) FREng FRSE is a British civil engineer, statistician and data engineer. He has held the Sir Kirby Laing Professorship of Civil Engineering in the Department of Engineering at the University of Cambridge since 2019. He has been the chief scientist of the Alan Turing Institute since 2021. He is a Fellow of Christ's College, Cambridge, and winner of a Royal Society Wolfson Research Merit Award. Girolami is a founding editor of the journal Data-Centric Engineering, and also served as the program director for data-centric engineering at Turing.

== Education ==
Girolami studied at the University of Glasgow and spent ten years working for IBM as an engineer from 1985 to 1994. After this he undertook, on a part-time basis, a PhD in statistical signal processing whilst working at the University of Paisley.

In 2024, the University of the West of Scotland awarded Girolami an honorary doctorate recognising his exceptional achievements in engineering and computing.

== Career and research ==
After his PhD, Girolami held senior positions at the University of Glasgow, and University College London.

Before joining the University of Cambridge, Girolami worked at Imperial College London.

=== Selected publications ===
His publications include:

- Girolami, Mark (1999). Self-organising neural networks : independent component analysis and blind source separation. London: Springer. ISBN 1-85233-066-X. OCLC 41165446.
- Girolami, Mark, ed. (2000). Advances in independent component analysis. London: Springer. ISBN 1-85233-263-8. OCLC 43580473.
- Lawrence, Neil; Girolami, Mark; Rattray, Magnus; Sanguinetti, Guido, eds. (2009). Learning and inference in computational systems biology. Cambridge, Mass.: MIT Press. ISBN 978-0-262-01386-4. OCLC 416139763.
- Stumpf, M. P. H.; Balding, D. J.; Girolami, Mark, eds. (2011). Handbook of statistical systems biology. Chichester, West Sussex: John Wiley & Sons. ISBN 978-1-119-97061-3. OCLC 759159249.
- Rogers, Simon; Girolami, Mark (2020). A first course in machine learning (2nd ed.). Boca Raton. ISBN 978-0-367-57464-2. OCLC 1180151741.
- Lee, Te-Won; Girolami, Mark; Sejnowski, Terrence J. (1999-02-01). "Independent Component Analysis Using an Extended Infomax Algorithm for Mixed Subgaussian and Supergaussian Sources". Neural Computation. 11 (2): 417–441. doi:10.1162/089976699300016719. ISSN 0899-7667. PMID 9950738. S2CID 207739442.
- Girolami, M. (2002). "Mercer kernel-based clustering in feature space". IEEE Transactions on Neural Networks. 13 (3): 780–784. doi:10.1109/TNN.2002.1000150. ISSN 1045-9227. PMID 18244475.
- Girolami, Mark; Calderhead, Ben (2011-03-01). "Riemann Manifold Langevin and Hamiltonian Monte Carlo Methods". Journal of the Royal Statistical Society Series B: Statistical Methodology. 73 (2): 123–214. doi:10.1111/j.1467-9868.2010.00765.x. ISSN 1369-7412.
- Betancourt, Michael; Byrne, Simon; Livingstone, Sam; Girolami, Mark (2017-11-01). "The geometric foundations of Hamiltonian Monte Carlo". Bernoulli. 23 (4A). arXiv:1410.5110. doi:10.3150/16-BEJ810. ISSN 1350-7265. S2CID 88521216.
- Briol, François-Xavier; Oates, Chris J.; Girolami, Mark; Osborne, Michael A.; Sejdinovic, Dino (2019-02-01). "Probabilistic Integration: A Role in Statistical Computation?". Statistical Science. 34 (1). arXiv:1512.00933. doi:10.1214/18-STS660. ISSN 0883-4237. S2CID 13932715.
