= The Meaning of the 21st Century =

Book by James Martin

The Meaning of the 21st Century: A Vital Blueprint for Ensuring Our Future
- First edition (UK)
- Author: James Martin
- Language: English
- Subject: Global catastrophic risks
- Publisher: Eden Project Books (UK); Riverhead Books (US)
- Publication date: 2006
- Media type: Print
- ISBN: 9781573223232
- Website: www.jamesmartin.com/book/

The Meaning of the 21st Century: A Vital Blueprint for Ensuring Our Future is a 2006 nonfiction book by British technology consultant James Martin.

== Synopsis ==
It assesses technological challenges, dangers and opportunities facing the human race. The book lists and proposes solutions for 17 interlocked upcoming "megaproblems". Topics include nanotechnology, artificial intelligence, climate change and terrorism. Martin asserts that many global problems have been worsened by past technologies, but could be addressed by new ones. For example, he advocates for "electronic brain appendages" to help think through to a solution to problems such as global warming.

== Film ==
Martin released a film based on the book, narrated by one of his Bermudan neighbors, Hollywood actor Michael Douglas.
