= Neil Lawrence =

British computer scientist

- Born: Neil David Lawrence
- Education: University of Southampton (BEng); University of Cambridge (PhD)
- Scientific career
- Fields: Machine learning Gaussian processes
- Workplaces: University of Manchester; University of Sheffield; University of Cambridge; Alan Turing Institute; Microsoft Research; Amazon Research
- Thesis: Variational Inference in Probabilistic Models (2000)
- Doctoral advisor: Christopher Bishop
- Website: inverseprobability.com

Neil David Lawrence is the DeepMind Professor of Machine Learning at the University of Cambridge in the Department of Computer Science and Technology, Chief Scientist at Trent AI, senior AI fellow at the Alan Turing Institute and visiting professor at the University of Sheffield.

== Education ==
Lawrence obtained a Bachelors in Engineering degree in mechanical engineering at the University of Southampton, and a PhD from the University of Cambridge, with a thesis on variational inference in probabilistic models, supervised by Christopher Bishop.

== Career and research ==
Lawrence spent a year at Microsoft Research before serving as a senior lecturer in machine learning and computational biology at the University of Sheffield for six years. From 2007 to 2010, Lawrence was research fellow at the University of Manchester's Department of Computer Science, returning to the University of Sheffield in 2010 as the collaborative chair of neuro and computer science.

In 2016, he was appointed director of machine learning at Amazon in Cambridge, where he collaborated with Ralf Herbrich, who became director of machine learning at Amazon in Berlin.

Upon his appointment as the inaugural DeepMind Professor Machine Learning at the University of Cambridge in September 2019, Ann Copestake stated Lawrence's addition would have a "transformative effect".

Lawrence co-founded Trent AI in 2025 with a mission to reimagine security and safety of systems in the AI age. He serves as its Chief Scientist.

=== Ambassadorship ===
Lawrence has advocated for data transparency and privacy, writing several prominent articles in The Guardian discussing issues ranging from the privacy implications of Machine Learning algorithms deployed on citizens, the current "state of the art" in the field, the importance of data-sharing and academic transparency, to the possibilities for Machine Learning to advance developing nations such as African nations. These efforts have been called "commendable" by Demis Hassabis.

He was solicited for his opinion on the absence of Machine Learning algorithms during the COVID-19 pandemic, to which he stated

"This is showing what bulls—t most AI hype is. It's great and it will be useful one day but it's not surprising in a pandemic that we fall back on tried and tested techniques."

Lawrence has hosted a podcast with Katherine Gorman called Talking Machines between 2014 and 2021.

In 2025 he was a guest on the BBC Radio 4 programme The Life Scientific.
