= Girolami method =

Method of estimating liquid densities

The Girolami method, named after Gregory Girolami, is a predictive method for estimating densities of pure liquid components at room temperature. The objective of this method is the simple prediction of the density and not high precision.

== Procedure ==
The method uses purely additive volume contributions for single atoms and additional correction factors for components with special functional groups which cause a volume contraction and therefore a higher density. The Girolami method can be described as a mixture of an atom and group contribution method.

=== Atom contributions ===
The method uses the following contributions for the different atoms:

Element	Relative volume V_{i}
Hydrogen	1
Lithium to Fluorine	2
Sodium to Chlorine	4
Potassium to Bromine	5
Rubidium to Iodine	7.5
Cesium to Bismuth	9

A scaled molecular volume is calculated by

$$V_S \,=\, \sum_i V_i$$

and the density is derived by

$$d \,=\, \frac{M}{5 \cdot V_S}$$

with the molecular weight M. The scaling factor 5 is used to obtain the density in g·cm^{−3}.

=== Group contribution ===
For some components Girolami found smaller volumes and higher densities than calculated solely by the atom contributions. For components with

- a hydroxylic function (Alcohols)
- a carboxylic function (Carboxylic acids)
- a primary or secondary amine function
- an amide group (incl. amides substituted at the nitrogen)
- a sulfoxide group
- a sulfone group
- a ring (non-condensed),

it is sufficient to add 10% to the density obtained by the main equation. For sulfone groups it is necessary to use this factor twice (20%).

Another specific case are condensed ring systems like Naphthalene. The density has to increased by 7.5% for every ring; for Naphthalene the resulting factor would be 15%.

If multiple corrections are needed their factors have to be added but not over 130% in total.

== Example calculation ==
Component	M [^{g}/_{mol}]	Volume V_{S}	Corrections	Calculated density [g·cm^{−3}]	Exp. density [g·cm^{−3}]
Cyclohexanol	100	(6×2)+(13×1)+(1×2)=26	One ring and a hydroxylic group = 120%	d=^{1.2*100}/_{5×26}=0.92	0.962
Dimethylethylphosphine	90	(4×2)+(11×1)+(1×4)=23	No corrections	d=^{90}/_{5×23}=0.78	0.76
Ethylenediamine	60	(2×2)+(8×1)+(2×2)=16	Two primary amine groups = 120%	d=^{1.2×60}/_{5×16}=0.90	0.899
Sulfolane	120	(4×2)+(8×1)+(2×2)+(1×4)=24	One ring and two S=O bonds = 130%	d=^{1.3×120}/_{5×24}=1.30	1.262
1-Bromonaphthalene	207	(10×2)+(7×1)+(1×5)=32	Two condensed rings = 115%	d=^{1,15×207}/_{5×32}=1.49	1.483

== Quality ==
The author has given a mean quadratic error (RMS) of 0.049 g·cm^{−3} for 166 checked components. Only for two components (acetonitrile and dibromochloromethane) has an error greater than 0.1 g·cm ^{−3} been found.
