= Clive Finkelstein =

Australian computer scientist

Clive Finkelstein (born ca. 1939 died 9/12/2021) was an Australian computer scientist, known as the "Father" of information engineering methodology.

== Life and work ==
In 1961 Finkelstein received his Bachelor of Science from the University of New South Wales in Sydney. After graduation Finkelstein started working in the field of database processing for IBM in Australia and in the USA. Back in Australia in 1976 he founded the IT consultancy firm Infocom Australia.

In 1972 Finkelstein was elected Fellow of the Australian Computer Society. Finkelstein was a distinguished member of the International Advisory Board of the Data Administration Management Association (DAMA International), with John Zachman. In 2008 he was awarded a position in the Pearcey Hall of Fame of the ACS in Australia.

From 1976 to 1980 Finkelstein developed the concept of information technology engineering, based on original work carried out by him to bridge from strategic business planning to information systems. He wrote the first publication on information technology engineering: a series of six in-depth articles by the same name published by US Computerworld in May - June 1981. He also co-authored with James Martin the influential Savant Institute Report titled: "Information Engineering", published in Nov 1981. He also wrote a monthly column, "The Enterprise" for DM Review magazine.

Finkelstein died from Parkinsons Disease in September 2021 (per phone call with Jill Finkelstein)

== Selected publications ==
- Martin, James, and Clive Finkelstein. Information Engineering Savant, Nov 1981.
- Finkelstein, Clive. An introduction to Information Engineering: from Strategic Planning to Information Systems. Addison-Wesley Longman Publishing Co., Inc., 1989.
- Finkelstein, Clive. Information Engineering: Strategic Systems Development. Addison-Wesley Longman Publishing Co., Inc., 1992.
- Finkelstein, Clive, and Peter Aiken. Building Corporate portals with XML. McGraw-Hill, Inc., 2000.
- Clive Finkelstein. Enterprise Architecture for Integration: Rapid Delivery Methods and Technologies, First Edition, Artech House, 2006. Hardcover.
- Clive Finkelstein. Enterprise Architecture for Integration: Rapid Delivery Methods and Technologies, Second Edition, IES, 2011. ebook.
- Clive Finkelstein. Enterprise Architecture for Integration: Rapid Delivery Methods and Technologies, Third Edition, 2015 ebook - download in PDF from www.ies.aust.com.
