= Iain Buchan =

British public health physician and data scientist

Iain Edward Buchan
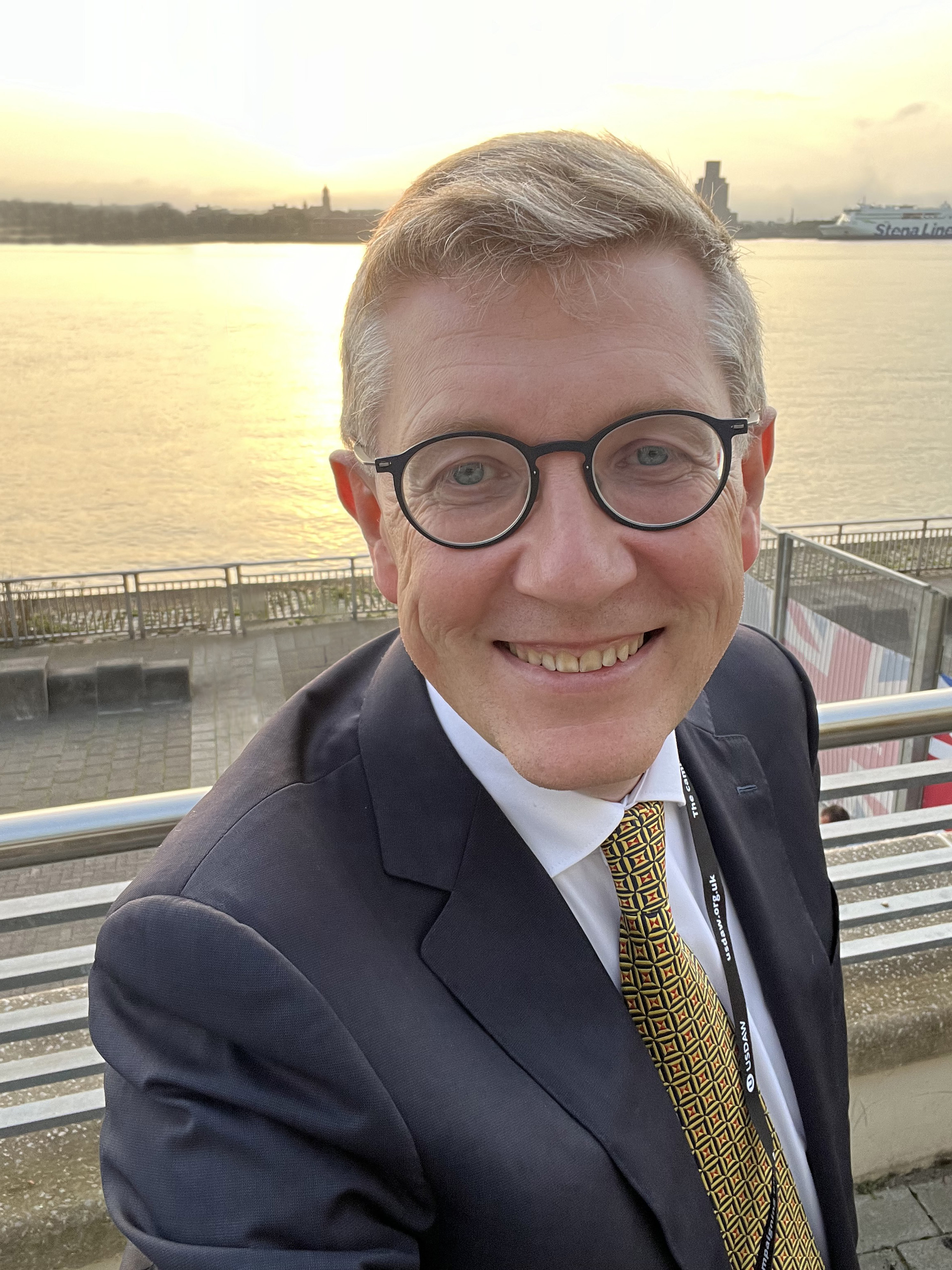
- Born: Liverpool
- Occupations: Public health physician, data scientist and academic
- Awards: Florence Nightingale Award, Royal Statistical Society (2023); Alwyn-Smith Medal, Faculty of Public Health (2022)

Academic background
- Education: BSc (hons)., Pharmacology (1989); MB ChB., Medicine (1991); MD., Computational statistics (2000)
- Alma mater: University of Liverpool; University of Cambridge

Iain Edward Buchan is a public health physician, data scientist and academic. He holds the W.H. Duncan Chair of Public Health Systems and is Associate Pro Vice Chancellor for Innovation at the University of Liverpool.

Buchan's research focuses on health data science and informatics to enable better prevention, early intervention, and value of care for patients and populations. He has written 367 articles and his work has been cited over 30,000 times according to Google Scholar. He is most known for leading the world's first evaluation of mass rapid antigen testing, and the first realistic risk-mitigated reopening of mass events during the UK's response to the COVID-19 pandemic. He also developed the Civic Data Cooperative, which resulted in the Combined Intelligence for Population Health Action (CIPHA) system during the pandemic. He is the recipient of HTN Health Tech Award, Alwyn-Smith Medal, and Florence Nightingale Award.

Buchan is a Fellow of the Faculty of Public Health, the American College of Medical Informatics, British Computer Society and the Faculty of Clinical Informatics. He has also been an advisor to UK, European and international health policy groups, AstraZeneca) and research organizations including UKRI, Wellcome Trust and the UK National Institute for Health and Care Research (NIHR), for which he is a Senior Investigator.

== Education and early career ==
In the 1980s, Buchan pursued medical training alongside studies in pharmacology and statistical software development. As an undergraduate, he published the first version of a statistical package called "StatsDirect." During the 1990s, as a junior doctor, he researched care pathways, health system dynamics, and care inequities. Later, he trained as a public health consultant while conducting research in medical informatics and pursuing doctoral studies in computational statistics.

== Career ==
Buchan began his academic career in 1992 as an Honorary Clinical Lecturer at the University of Liverpool. He then served as a Research Associate in Medical Informatics at the University of Cambridge in 1996 and Senior Research Fellow in Medical Informatics at Wolfson College, Cambridge in 1997, before training as a Consultant in Public Health. In 2003, he joined the University of Manchester as a Clinical Senior Lecturer in Public Health Intelligence and was promoted in 2008 to Clinical Professor in Public Health Informatics. There, from 2003 to 2017, he founded Health eResearch Centre and co-directed the Farr Institute. In the E-Science movement of the early 2000s he conceived e-Labs and Research Objects, leading to today's Trusted Research Environments and applications in healthcare. At Manchester, he also invented the FARSITE system, helping spin out NW eHealth, and started the #DataSavesLives movement and the Connected Health Cities project.

Subsequently, Buchan served as Director of Healthcare Research at Microsoft Research Cambridge in 2017–2018, producing two patents and furthering the health avatar framework he had conceived eight years earlier.

In 2018, Buchan returned to Liverpool as the University of Liverpool's first chair in Public Health and Clinical Informatics. From 2019 to 2022, he was the founding Executive Dean of the Institute of Population Health at Liverpool, whilst leading research responses to the COVID-19 pandemic. Since 2022, he has been conducting multidisciplinary research partnerships, especially in health technology as Associate Pro Vice Chancellor for Innovation.

== Research ==
Buchan's research areas encompass public health, data science, clinical informatics, epidemiology, and biostatistics. In particular, he has published in areas related to public health challenges, such as inequalities, obesity, mental health and pandemic resilience, and in methodology, including machine learning in epidemiology, research objects in e-science, learning health systems, and the concept of a digital twin/health avatar for healthcare.

=== COVID-19 response and data-intensive public health research ===
Buchan led the world's first evaluation of voluntary mass testing for the SARS-CoV2 antigen with lateral flow devices, working with the British Army, local and national government, public health agencies and the UK's National Health Service. This work provided quick proof that lateral flow devices worked as expected to detect people infected with the COVID-19 virus whether they had symptoms or not. Responding to media debate over the reliability of lateral flow devices, he clarified the evidence regarding a public health test versus a clinical test for COVID-19. The impact of this testing was that COVID-19 hospital admissions fell by 43% initially and 25% overall. The BMJ asked him and colleagues for an accompanying methodology paper on the data analysis as a blueprint of best practice. The UK's universal access community testing policy was shaped by this work, including its demonstration of inequalities in testing uptake and barriers such as digital poverty. He had also formulated a test-to-release daily testing alternative to quarantine for close contacts of cases, which resulted in the Daily Contact Testing policy. He also researched COVID-19 and informed policies in other contexts including care homes, hospitals, schools, and vaccination.

In Spring 2021, Buchan applied previous testing and other COVID-19 risk mitigation research to address the issue of young people being vaccinated last and missing out on social development opportunities due to the continued lockdown of significant cultural events. So, he led a city-scale reopening (after COVID-19 lockdowns) of a cluster of business, nightclub and a music festival events – resulting in minimal SARS-CoV-2 transmission, high levels of enjoyment, low levels of fear over risks, and demonstrated the effectiveness of collaborative strategies for health security at mass cultural gatherings.

=== Public health and data science ===
Buchan's research has underscored the importance of trust in health data utilization, highlighting transparency, consent, and public involvement, with a specific focus on the role of national governments in the reuse of health data. Building on earlier work in civic data linkage and public health intelligence, he established the first Civic Data Cooperative in Liverpool in late 2019, and put a National Grid of Civic Data Cooperatives forward to the UK Government as means of improving health system innovation and resilience.

Buchan engaged machine learning researchers from Microsoft Research in the field of epidemiology, leading to discoveries pertaining to asthma and allergies. Most recently, he formed the Mental Health Research for Innovation Centre of the UK Government's Mental Health Mission.

Buchan conducted research on other health data science directions including Trusted/Trustworthy Research Environments with Research Objects and eLab networks to improve research reproducibility and tackle the widespread problem of calibration drift in clinical prediction models. He drew attention to the problem of multimorbidity and the need for a unified modelling approach, not only for discovery science but also for personalized care via interactive Health Avatars.

Some of Buchan's most highly cited papers arose from applications of his statistical software to public health problems. He has worked to make better use of routine health record data with combined biostatistics and machine learning approaches to predicting clinical outcomes.

Buchan's data science research has focused on addressing public health challenges, including obesity, inequalities, mental health, and pandemics. He raised a warning over obesity among pre-school children using routinely collected data, then alerted to the high burden of cancer attributable to obesity, then highlighted the challenges of using consumer technology data to understand weight control. He drew attention to the excess of premature deaths in North compared with South England and the need for regional growth incentives.

== Awards and honors ==
- 2012 – Fellow, American College of Medical Informatics
- 2014 – Manchester Ambassador, Greater Manchester Combined Authority
- 2017 – Fellow, British Computer Society
- 2017 (renewed 2023) – Senior Investigator, National Institute for Health and Care Research
- 2021 – Best Use of Health Data, HTN Health Tech Awards
- 2022 – Healthcare Project of the Year, BioNoW
- 2022 – Alwyn-Smith Medal, The Faculty of Public Health
- 2023 – Florence Nightingale Award, Royal Statistical Society

== Selected articles ==
- Bundred, P.; Kitchiner, D; Buchan, I (10 February 2001). "Prevalence of overweight and obese children between 1989 and 1998: population based series of cross sectional studies". BMJ. 322 (7282): 326–328. doi:10.1136/bmj.322.7282.326. PMC 26573. PMID 11159654.
- Simpson, Angela; Tan, Vincent Y. F.; Winn, John; Svensén, Markus; Bishop, Christopher M.; Heckerman, David E.; Buchan, Iain; Custovic, Adnan (1 June 2010). "Beyond Atopy: Multiple Patterns of Sensitization in Relation to Asthma in a Birth Cohort Study". American Journal of Respiratory and Critical Care Medicine. 181 (11): 1200–1206. doi:10.1164/rccm.200907-1101OC. PMID 20167852.
- Hacking, J. M.; Muller, S.; Buchan, I. E. (15 February 2011). "Trends in mortality from 1965 to 2008 across the English north-south divide: comparative observational study". BMJ. 342 (feb15 2): d508. doi:10.1136/bmj.d508. PMC 3039695. PMID 21325004.
- Bechhofer, Sean; Buchan, Iain; De Roure, David; Missier, Paolo; Ainsworth, John; Bhagat, Jiten; Couch, Philip; Cruickshank, Don; Delderfield, Mark; Dunlop, Ian; Gamble, Matthew; Michaelides, Danius; Owen, Stuart; Newman, David; Sufi, Shoaib; Goble, Carole (February 2013). "Why linked data is not enough for scientists". Future Generation Computer Systems. 29 (2): 599–611. doi:10.1016/j.future.2011.08.004.
- Belgrave, Danielle C. M.; Buchan, Iain; Bishop, Christopher; Lowe, Lesley; Simpson, Angela; Custovic, Adnan (1 May 2014). "Trajectories of Lung Function during Childhood". American Journal of Respiratory and Critical Care Medicine. 189 (9): 1101–1109. doi:10.1164/rccm.201309-1700OC. PMC 4098108. PMID 24606581.
- Ainsworth, J.; Buchan, I. (2015). "Combining Health Data Uses to Ignite Health System Learning". Methods of Information in Medicine. 54 (6): 479–487. doi:10.3414/ME15-01-0064. PMID 26395036.
- Sperrin, Matthew; Candlish, Jane; Badrick, Ellena; Renehan, Andrew; Buchan, Iain (July 2016). "Collider Bias Is Only a Partial Explanation for the Obesity Paradox". Epidemiology. 27 (4): 525–530. doi:10.1097/EDE.0000000000000493. PMC 4890843. PMID 27075676.
- García-Fiñana, Marta; Hughes, David M; Cheyne, Christopher P; Burnside, Girvan; Stockbridge, Mark; Fowler, Tom A; Fowler, Veronica L; Wilcox, Mark H; Semple, Malcolm G; Buchan, Iain (6 July 2021). "Performance of the Innova SARS-CoV-2 antigen rapid lateral flow test in the Liverpool asymptomatic testing pilot: population based cohort study". BMJ. 374 n1637. doi:10.1136/bmj.n1637. PMC 8259455. PMID 34230058.
- Burnside, Girvan; Cheyne, Christopher P; Leeming, Gary; Humann, Michael; Darby, Alistair; Green, Mark A; Crozier, Alexander; Maskell, Simon; O'Halloran, Kay; Musi, Elena; Carmi, Elinor; Khan, Naila; Fisher, Debra; Corcoran, Rhiannon; Dunning, Jake; Edmunds, W John; Tharmaratnam, Kukatharmini; Hughes, David M; Malki-Epshtein, Liora; Cook, Malcolm; Roberts, Ben M; Gallagher, Eileen; Howell, Kate; Chand, Meera; Kemp, Robin; Boulter, Matthew; Fowler, Tom; Semple, Malcolm G; Coffey, Emer; Ashton, Matt; García-Fiñana, Marta; Buchan, Iain E; Buchan, IE (January 2024). "COVID-19 risk mitigation in reopening mass cultural events: population-based observational study for the UK Events Research Programme in Liverpool City Region". Journal of the Royal Society of Medicine. 117 (1): 11–23. doi:10.1177/01410768231182389. PMC 10858718. PMID 37351911.
