= Robert Pepper =

- Born: February 10, 1948 (age 78)
- Education: University of Wisconsin–Madison (PhD)
- Awards: Turing Lecture (2015)
- Scientific career
- Workplaces: CISCO
- Thesis: The Formation of the Public Broadcasting Service (1975)

Robert M. Pepper (born February 10, 1948) is an American specialist in communications policy.

== Education ==
Pepper received his Bachelor of Arts degree and Ph.D. from the University of Wisconsin–Madison.

== Career ==
Pepper held faculty positions at the University of Iowa, Indiana University, and University of Pennsylvania, and was a research affiliate at Harvard University. Following this he was Director of the Annenberg Washington Program in Communications Policy.

He was subsequently Chief of the Office of Plans and Policy and Chief of Policy Development at the U.S. Federal Communications Commission (FCC), and office now known as OSP. At the FCC, he worked on issues such as implementing telecommunications legislation, planning for the transition to digital television, designing and implementing the first U.S. spectrum auctions. He has also been Acting Associate Administrator at the National Telecommunications and Information Administration (NTIA) and initiator of a program on Computers, Communications and Information Policy at the National Science Foundation.

He leads Global Connectivity and Technology Policy at Facebook, joining the company in 2016. He was formerly Vice President for Global Technology Policy at Cisco, having joined the company in 2005. He is responsible for the international aspects of the company's advanced technology policy, working in areas such as broadband, IP enabled services, wireless, security and privacy and ICT development.

He serves on the board of directors of the U.S. Telecommunications Training Institute (USTTI) and the advisory boards for Columbia University and Michigan State University, and is a Communications Program Fellow at the Aspen Institute. He is a member of the U.S. Department of Commerce's Spectrum Management Advisory Committee, the UK's Ofcom Spectrum Advisory Board and the U.S. Department of State's Advisory Committee on International Communications and Information Policy.

== Awards and honors ==
In 2015 he presented the IET's Pinkerton Lecture and the Turing Lecture.
