= Densities of the elements (data page) =

Chemical data page

== Density, solid phase ==
In the following table, the use row is the value recommended for use in other Wikipedia pages in order to maintain consistency across content.

2 He helium-4
Hoffer et al.	0.19085 g/cm^{3} (from 20.9730 cm^{3}/mole; hcp crystal melting to He-II superfluid at 0 K, 25.00 atm)
Hoffer et al.	0.19083 g/cm^{3} (from 20.9749 cm^{3}/mole; at local min. density, hcp melting to He-II: 0.884 K, 25.00 atm)
Hoffer et al.	0.19142 g/cm^{3} (from 20.910 cm^{3}/mole; hcp at triple point hcp−bcc−He-II: 1.463 K, 26.036 atm)
Hoffer et al.	0.18971 g/cm^{3} (from 21.098 cm^{3}/mole; bcc at triple point hcp−bcc−He-II: 1.463 K, 26.036 atm)
Hoffer et al.	0.19406 g/cm^{3} (from 20.626 cm^{3}/mole; hcp at triple point hcp−bcc−He-I: 1.772 K, 30.016 atm)
Hoffer et al.	0.19208 g/cm^{3} (from 20.8381 cm^{3}/mole; bcc at triple point hcp−bcc−He-I: 1.772 K, 30.016 atm)
3 Li lithium
use	0.534 g/cm^{3}
WEL	(near r.t.) 535 kg/m^{3}
LNG	(at 20 °C) 0.534 g/cm^{3}
CRC	(near r.t.) 0.534 g/cm^{3}
4 Be beryllium
use	1.85 g/cm^{3}
WEL	(near r.t.) 1848 kg/m^{3}
LNG	(at 20 °C) 1.8477 g/cm^{3}
CRC	(near r.t.) 1.85 g/cm^{3}
5 B boron
use	2.34 g/cm^{3}
WEL	(near r.t.) 2460 kg/m^{3}
LNG	(at r.t.) 2.34 g/cm^{3}
CRC	(near r.t.) 2.34 g/cm^{3}
6 C carbon (graphite)
use	2.267 g/cm^{3}
WEL	(near r.t.) 2267 kg/m^{3}
LNG	(at r.t.) 2.267 g/cm^{3}
CRC	(near r.t.) 2.2 g/cm^{3}
6 C carbon (diamond)
use	3.513 g/cm^{3}
LNG	(at r.t.) 3.513 g/cm^{3}
CRC	(near r.t.) 3.513 g/cm^{3}
11 Na sodium
use	0.968 g/cm^{3}
WEL	(near r.t.) 968 kg/m^{3}
LNG	(at 20 °C) 0.968 g/cm^{3}
CRC	(near r.t.) 0.97 g/cm^{3}
12 Mg magnesium
use	1.738 g/cm^{3}
WEL	(near r.t.) 1738 kg/m^{3}
LNG	(at 20 °C) 1.738 g/cm^{3}
CRC	(near r.t.) 1.74 g/cm^{3}
13 Al aluminium
use	2.70 g/cm^{3}
WEL	(near r.t.) 2700 kg/m^{3}
LNG	(at r.t.) 2.70 g/cm^{3}
CRC	(near r.t.) 2.70 g/cm^{3}
14 Si silicon
use	2.33 g/cm^{3}
WEL	(near r.t.) 2330 kg/m^{3}
LNG	(at r.t.) 2.33 g/cm^{3}
CRC	(near r.t.) 2.3290 g/cm^{3}
15 P phosphorus (white)
use	1.823 g/cm^{3}
WEL	(near r.t.) 1823 kg/m^{3}
LNG	(at 25 °C) 1.823 g/cm^{3}
CRC	(near r.t.) 1.823 g/cm^{3}
15 P phosphorus (red)
use	2.34 g/cm^{3}
LNG	(at r.t.) 2.34 g/cm^{3}
CRC	(near r.t.) 2.16 g/cm^{3}
15 P phosphorus (black)
use	2.69 g/cm^{3}
CRC	(near r.t.) 2.69 g/cm^{3}
16 S sulfur (orthorhombic, alpha)
use	2.08 g/cm^{3}
WEL	? (1960 kg/m^{3})
LNG	(at 20 °C) 2.08 g/cm^{3}
CRC	(near r.t.) 2.07 g/cm^{3}
16 S sulfur (monoclinic, beta)
use	1.96 g/cm^{3}
WEL	? (1960 kg/m^{3})
LNG	(at r.t.) 1.96 g/cm^{3}
CRC	? (near r.t.) 2.07 g/cm^{3}
16 S sulfur (gamma)
use	1.92 g/cm^{3}
LNG	(at r.t.) 1.92 g/cm^{3}
19 K potassium
use	0.89 g/cm^{3}
WEL	(near r.t.) 856 kg/m^{3}
LNG	(at r.t.) 0.89 g/cm^{3}
CRC	(near r.t.) 0.89 g/cm^{3}
20 Ca calcium
use	1.55 g/cm^{3}
WEL	(near r.t.) 1550 kg/m^{3}
LNG	(at r.t.) 1.55 g/cm^{3}
CRC	(near r.t.) 1.54 g/cm^{3}
21 Sc scandium (hexagonal ?)
use	2.985 g/cm^{3}
WEL	(near r.t.) 2985 kg/m^{3}
LNG	(at r.t.) (hexagonal) 2.985 g/cm^{3}
CRC	(near r.t.) 2.99 g/cm^{3}
22 Ti titanium (hexagonal ?)
use	4.506 g/cm^{3}
WEL	(near r.t.) 4507 kg/m^{3}
LNG	(at r.t.) (hexagonal) 4.506 g/cm^{3}
CRC	(near r.t.) 4.506 g/cm^{3}
23 V vanadium
use	6.11 g/cm^{3}
WEL	(near r.t.) 6110 kg/m^{3}
LNG	(at 19 °C) 6.11 g/cm^{3}
CRC	(near r.t.) 6.0 g/cm^{3}
24 Cr chromium
use	7.15 g/cm^{3}
WEL	(near r.t.) 7140 kg/m^{3}
LNG	(at r.t.) 7.15 g/cm^{3}
CRC	(near r.t.) 7.15 g/cm^{3}
25 Mn manganese
use	7.21 g/cm^{3}
WEL	(near r.t.) 7470 kg/m^{3}
LNG	(at 20 °C) 7.21 g/cm^{3}
CRC	(near r.t.) 7.3 g/cm^{3}
26 Fe iron
use	7.86 g/cm^{3}
WEL	(near r.t.) 7874 kg/m^{3}
LNG	(at r.t.) 7.86 g/cm^{3}
CRC	(near r.t.) 7.87 g/cm^{3}
27 Co cobalt
use	8.90 g/cm^{3}
WEL	(near r.t.) 8900 kg/m^{3}
LNG	(at r.t.) 8.90 g/cm^{3}
CRC	(near r.t.) 8.86 g/cm^{3}
28 Ni nickel
use	8.908 g/cm^{3}
WEL	(near r.t.) 8908 kg/m^{3}
LNG	(at 20 °C) 8.908 g/cm^{3}
CRC	(near r.t.) 8.90 g/cm^{3}
29 Cu copper
use	8.96 g/cm^{3}
WEL	(near r.t.) 8920 kg/m^{3}
LNG	(at 20 °C) 8.96 g/cm^{3}
CRC	(near r.t.) 8.96 g/cm^{3}
30 Zn zinc
use	7.14 g/cm^{3}
WEL	(near r.t.) 7140 kg/m^{3}
LNG	(at r.t.) 7.14 g/cm^{3}
CRC	(near r.t.) 7.14 g/cm^{3}
31 Ga gallium
use	5.91 g/cm^{3}
WEL	(near r.t.) 5904 kg/m^{3}
LNG	(at 29.6 °C) 5.904 g/cm^{3}
CRC	(near r.t.) 5.91 g/cm^{3}
32 Ge germanium
use	5.323 g/cm^{3}
WEL	(near r.t.) 5323 kg/m^{3}
LNG	(at r.t.) 5.323 g/cm^{3}
CRC	(near r.t.) 5.3234 g/cm^{3}
33 As arsenic
use	5.727 g/cm^{3}
WEL	(near r.t.) 5727 kg/m^{3}
LNG	(at 25 °C) (5.727 rel. to water at 4 °C)
CRC	(near r.t.) 5.75 g/cm^{3}
34 Se selenium (hexagonal, gray)
use	4.81 g/cm^{3}
WEL	(near r.t.) 4819 kg/m^{3}
LNG	(at 20 °C) (4.81 rel. to water at 4 °C)
CRC	(near r.t.) 4.81 g/cm^{3}
34 Se selenium (alpha)
use	4.39 g/cm^{3}
WEL	? (4819 kg/m^{3})
CRC	(near r.t.) 4.39 g/cm^{3}
34 Se selenium (vitreous)
use	4.28 g/cm^{3}
WEL	? (4819 kg/m^{3})
CRC	(near r.t.) 4.28 g/cm^{3}
37 Rb rubidium
use	1.532 g/cm^{3}
WEL	(near r.t.) 1532 kg/m^{3}
LNG	(at r.t.) 1.532 g/cm^{3}
CRC	(near r.t.) 1.53 g/cm^{3}
38 Sr strontium
use	2.64 g/cm^{3}
WEL	(near r.t.) 2630 kg/m^{3}
LNG	(at r.t.) 2.64 g/cm^{3}
CRC	(near r.t.) 2.64 g/cm^{3}
39 Y yttrium
use	4.472 g/cm^{3}
WEL	(near r.t.) 4472 kg/m^{3}
LNG	(at r.t.) 4.472 g/cm^{3}
CRC	(near r.t.) 4.47 g/cm^{3}
40 Zr zirconium
use	6.52 g/cm^{3}
WEL	(near r.t.) 6511 kg/m^{3}
LNG	(at r.t.) 6.52 g/cm^{3}
CRC	(near r.t.) 6.52 g/cm^{3}
41 Nb niobium
use	8.57 g/cm^{3}
WEL	(near r.t.) 8570 kg/m^{3}
LNG	(at 20 °C) 8.57 g/cm^{3}
CRC	(near r.t.) 8.57 g/cm^{3}
42 Mo molybdenum
use	10.28 g/cm^{3}
WEL	(near r.t.) 10280 kg/m^{3}
LNG	(at r.t.) 10.28 g/cm^{3}
CRC	(near r.t.) 10.2 g/cm^{3}
43 Tc technetium (Tc-98 ?)
use	11 g/cm^{3}
WEL	(near r.t.) 11500 kg/m^{3}
LNG	(at r.t.) (Tc-98) 11 g/cm^{3}
CRC	(near r.t.) 11 g/cm^{3}
44 Ru ruthenium
use	12.45 g/cm^{3}
WEL	(near r.t.) 12370 kg/m^{3}
LNG	(at 20 °C) (12.45 rel. to water at 4 °C)
CRC	(near r.t.) 12.1 g/cm^{3}
45 Rh rhodium
use	12.41 g/cm^{3}
WEL	(near r.t.) 12450 kg/m^{3}
LNG	(at 20 °C) 12.41 g/cm^{3}
CRC	(near r.t.) 12.4 g/cm^{3}
46 Pd palladium
use	12.023 g/cm^{3}
WEL	(near r.t.) 12023 kg/m^{3}
LNG	(at 20 °C) 12.023 g/cm^{3}
CRC	(near r.t.) 12.0 g/cm^{3}
47 Ag silver
use	10.49 g/cm^{3}
WEL	(near r.t.) 10490 kg/m^{3}
LNG	(at r.t.) 10.49 g/cm^{3}
CRC	(near r.t.) 10.5 g/cm^{3}
48 Cd cadmium
use	8.65 g/cm^{3}
WEL	(near r.t.) 8650 kg/m^{3}
LNG	(at 25 °C) 8.65 g/cm^{3}
CRC	(near r.t.) 8.69 g/cm^{3}
49 In indium
use	7.31 g/cm^{3}
WEL	(near r.t.) 7310 kg/m^{3}
LNG	(at r.t.) 7.31 g/cm^{3}
CRC	(near r.t.) 7.31 g/cm^{3}
50 Sn tin (white)
use	7.265 g/cm^{3}
WEL	(near r.t.) 7310 kg/m^{3}
LNG	(at r.t.) 7.265 g/cm^{3}
CRC	(near r.t.) 7.265 g/cm^{3}
50 Sn tin (gray)
use	5.769 g/cm^{3}
CRC	(near r.t.) 5.769 g/cm^{3}
51 Sb antimony
use	6.697 g/cm^{3}
WEL	(near r.t.) 6697 kg/m^{3}
LNG	(at 25 °C) 6.697 g/cm^{3}
CRC	(near r.t.) 6.68 g/cm^{3}
52 Te tellurium
use	6.24 g/cm^{3}
WEL	(near r.t.) 6240 kg/m^{3}
LNG	(at r.t.) 6.24 g/cm^{3}
CRC	(near r.t.) 6.24 g/cm^{3}
53 I iodine (I_{2})
use	4.933 g/cm^{3}
WEL	(near r.t.) 4940 kg/m^{3}
LNG	(at 25 °C) 4.63 g/cm^{3}
CRC	(near r.t.) 4.933 g/cm^{3}
55 Cs caesium
use	1.93 g/cm^{3}
WEL	(near r.t.) 1879 kg/m^{3}
LNG	(at 15 °C) 1.8785 g/cm^{3}
CRC	(near r.t.) 1.93 g/cm^{3}
56 Ba barium
use	3.51 g/cm^{3}
WEL	(near r.t.) 3510 kg/m^{3}
LNG	(at 20 °C) 3.51 g/cm^{3}
CRC	(near r.t.) 3.62 g/cm^{3}
57 La lanthanum
use	6.162 g/cm^{3}
WEL	(near r.t.) 6146 kg/m^{3}
LNG	(at r.t.) 6.162 g/cm^{3}
CRC	(near r.t.) 6.15 g/cm^{3}
58 Ce cerium
use	6.770 g/cm^{3}
WEL	(near r.t.) 6689 kg/m^{3}
LNG	(at r.t.) 6.773 g/cm^{3}
CRC	(near r.t.) 6.770 g/cm^{3}
59 Pr praseodymium (alpha ?)
use	6.77 g/cm^{3}
WEL	(near r.t.) 6640 kg/m^{3}
LNG	(at r.t.) (alpha) 6.475 g/cm^{3}
CRC	(near r.t.) 6.77 g/cm^{3}
60 Nd neodymium
use	7.01 g/cm^{3}
WEL	(near r.t.) 6800 kg/m^{3}
LNG	(at r.t.) 7.01 g/cm^{3}
CRC	(near r.t.) 7.01 g/cm^{3}
61 Pm promethium (Pm-147 ?)
use	7.26 g/cm^{3}
WEL	(near r.t.) 7264 kg/m^{3}
LNG	(at r.t.) (Pm-147) 7.22 g/cm^{3}
CRC	(near r.t.) 7.26 g/cm^{3}
62 Sm samarium
use	7.52 g/cm^{3}
WEL	(near r.t.) 7353 kg/m^{3}
LNG	(at r.t.) 7.52 g/cm^{3}
CRC	(near r.t.) 7.52 g/cm^{3}
63 Eu europium
use	5.244 g/cm^{3}
WEL	(near r.t.) 5244 kg/m^{3}
LNG	(at r.t.) 5.244 g/cm^{3}
CRC	(near r.t.) 5.24 g/cm^{3}
64 Gd gadolinium
use	7.90 g/cm^{3}
WEL	(near r.t.) 7901 kg/m^{3}
LNG	(at r.t.) 7.90 g/cm^{3}
CRC	(near r.t.) 7.90 g/cm^{3}
65 Tb terbium
use	8.23 g/cm^{3}
WEL	(near r.t.) 8219 kg/m^{3}
LNG	(at r.t.) 8.23 g/cm^{3}
CRC	(near r.t.) 8.23 g/cm^{3}
66 Dy dysprosium
use	8.540 g/cm^{3}
WEL	(near r.t.) 8551 kg/m^{3}
LNG	(at 25 °C) 8.540 g/cm^{3}
CRC	(near r.t.) 8.55 g/cm^{3}
67 Ho holmium
use	8.79 g/cm^{3}
WEL	(near r.t.) 8795 kg/m^{3}
LNG	(at r.t.) 8.79 g/cm^{3}
CRC	(near r.t.) 8.80 g/cm^{3}
68 Er erbium
use	9.066 g/cm^{3}
WEL	(near r.t.) 9066 kg/m^{3}
LNG	(at r.t.) 9.066 g/cm^{3}
CRC	(near r.t.) 9.07 g/cm^{3}
69 Tm thulium
use	9.32 g/cm^{3}
WEL	(near r.t.) 9321 kg/m^{3}
LNG	(at r.t.) 9.32 g/cm^{3}
CRC	(near r.t.) 9.32 g/cm^{3}
70 Yb ytterbium
use	6.90 g/cm^{3}
WEL	(near r.t.) 6570 kg/m^{3}
LNG	(at r.t.) 6.90 g/cm^{3}
CRC	(near r.t.) 6.90 g/cm^{3}
71 Lu lutetium
use	9.841 g/cm^{3}
WEL	(near r.t.) 9841 kg/m^{3}
LNG	(at r.t.) 9.841 g/cm^{3}
CRC	(near r.t.) 9.84 g/cm^{3}
72 Hf hafnium
use	13.31 g/cm^{3}
WEL	(near r.t.) 13310 kg/m^{3}
LNG	(at r.t.) 13.31 g/cm^{3}
CRC	(near r.t.) 13.3 g/cm^{3}
73 Ta tantalum
use	16.69 g/cm^{3}
WEL	(near r.t.) 16650 kg/m^{3}
LNG	(at r.t.) 16.69 g/cm^{3}
CRC	(near r.t.) 16.4 g/cm^{3}
74 W tungsten
use	19.25 g/cm^{3}
WEL	(near r.t.) 19250 kg/m^{3}
LNG	(at r.t.) 19.25 g/cm^{3}
CRC	(near r.t.) 19.3 g/cm^{3}
75 Re rhenium
use	21.02 g/cm^{3}
WEL	(near r.t.) 21020 kg/m^{3}
LNG	(at r.t.) 21.02 g/cm^{3}
CRC	(near r.t.) 20.8 g/cm^{3}
76 Os osmium
use	22.59 g/cm^{3}
WEL	(near r.t.) 22610 kg/m^{3}
LNG	(at 20 °C) 22.61 g/cm^{3}
CRC	(near r.t.) 22.59 g/cm^{3}
77 Ir iridium
use	22.56 g/cm^{3}
WEL	(near r.t.) 22650 kg/m^{3}
LNG	(at 20 °C) (22.65 rel. to water at 4 °C)
CRC	(near r.t.) 22.5 g/cm^{3}
78 Pt platinum
use	21.45 g/cm^{3}
WEL	(near r.t.) 21090 kg/m^{3}
LNG	(at 20 °C) 21.09 g/cm^{3}
CRC	(near r.t.) 21.5 g/cm^{3}
References according to http://hypertextbook.com/facts/2004/OliviaTai.shtml: 21.45 g/cm^{3} — Zumdahl, Steven S., Zumdahl, Susan L., & Decoste, Donald J. World of Chemistry. Boston: Houghton Mifflin Company, 2002: 141.; 21.45 × 10^{3} kg/m^{3} — Grigoriev, Igor S. & Meilikhov, Evgenii Z. Handbook of Physical Quantities. Boca Raton: CRC Press, 1997: 116.; 21.450 g/cm^{3} — Savitskii, E.M. Physical Metallurgy of Platinum Metals. New York: Pergamon Press, 1978: 31.; (20 °C) 21.45 g/cm^{3} — Vines, R.F. The Platinum Metals and their Alloys. New York: The International Nickel Company, Inc., 1941: 16. — "Values ranging from 21.3 to 21.5 gm/cm^{3} at 20 °C have been reported for the density of annealed platinum; the best value being about 21.45 gm/cm^{3} at 20 °C."; 21.46 g/cm^{3} — Rose, T. Kirke. The Precious Metals, Comprising Gold, Silver and Platinum. New York: D. Van Nostrand Company, 1909: 255. — "Pure platinum, according to G. Matthey has a density of 21.46."
79 Au gold
use	19.3 g/cm^{3}
WEL	(near r.t.) 19300 kg/m^{3}
LNG	(at r.t.) 19.3 g/cm^{3}
CRC	(near r.t.) 19.3 g/cm^{3}
81 Tl thallium
use	11.85 g/cm^{3}
WEL	(near r.t.) 11850 kg/m^{3}
LNG	(at r.t.) 11.85 g/cm^{3}
CRC	(near r.t.) 11.8 g/cm^{3}
82 Pb lead
use	11.34 g/cm^{3}
WEL	(near r.t.) 11340 kg/m^{3}
LNG	(at 20 °C) (face-centered cubic) (11.34 rel. to water at 4 °C)
CRC	(near r.t.) 11.3 g/cm^{3}
83 Bi bismuth
use	9.78 g/cm^{3}
WEL	(near r.t.) 9780 kg/m^{3}
LNG	(at r.t.) 9.78 g/cm^{3}
CRC	(near r.t.) 9.79 g/cm^{3}
84 Po polonium (alpha)
use	9.196 g/cm^{3}
WEL	(near r.t.) 9196 kg/m^{3}
LNG	(at r.t.) 9.196 g/cm^{3}
CRC	(near r.t.) 9.20 g/cm^{3}
84 Po polonium (beta)
use	9.398 g/cm^{3}
LNG	(at r.t.) 9.398 g/cm^{3}
85 At astatine
use	? 7 g/cm^{3}
87 Fr francium
use	? 2.48 g/cm^{3}
88 Ra radium
use	5.5 g/cm^{3}
WEL	(near r.t.) 5000 kg/m^{3}
LNG	(at r.t.) 5.5 g/cm^{3}
CRC	(near r.t.) 5 g/cm^{3}
89 Ac actinium (Ac-227 ?)
use	10 g/cm^{3}
WEL	(near r.t.) 10070 kg/m^{3}
LNG	(at r.t.) (Ac-227) 10.07 g/cm^{3}
CRC	(near r.t.) 10 g/cm^{3}
90 Th thorium
use	11.7 g/cm^{3}
WEL	(near r.t.) 11724 kg/m^{3}
LNG	(at r.t.) 11.7 g/cm^{3}
CRC	(near r.t.) 11.7 g/cm^{3}
91 Pa protactinium
use	15.37 g/cm^{3}
WEL	(near r.t.) 15370 kg/m^{3}
CRC	(near r.t.) 15.4 g/cm^{3}
92 U uranium
use	19.1 g/cm^{3}
WEL	(near r.t.) 19050 kg/m^{3}
LNG	(at r.t.) 19.1 g/cm^{3}
CRC	(near r.t.) 19.1 g/cm^{3}
93 Np neptunium
use	20.2 g/cm^{3}
WEL	(near r.t.) 20450 kg/m^{3}
LNG	(at r.t.) 20.2 g/cm^{3}
CRC	(near r.t.) 20.2 g/cm^{3}
94 Pu plutonium
use	19.816 g/cm^{3}
WEL	(near r.t.) 19816 kg/m^{3}
LNG	(at 20 °C) (19.816 rel. to water at 4 °C)
CRC	(near r.t.) 19.7 g/cm^{3}
95 Am americium
use	12 g/cm^{3}
LNG	(at r.t.) 12 g/cm^{3}
CRC	(near r.t.) 12 g/cm^{3}
96 Cm curium (Cm-244 ?)
use	13.51 g/cm^{3}
WEL	(near r.t.) 13510 kg/m^{3}
LNG	(at r.t.) (Cm-244) 13.51 g/cm^{3}
CRC	(near r.t.) 13.51 g/cm^{3}
97 Bk berkelium (alpha)
use	14.78 g/cm^{3}
WEL	(near r.t.) 14780 kg/m^{3}
LNG	(at r.t.) 14.78 g/cm^{3}
CRC	(near r.t.) 14.78 g/cm^{3}
97 Bk berkelium (beta)
use	13.25 g/cm^{3}
LNG	(at r.t.) 13.25 g/cm^{3}
CRC	(near r.t.) 13.25 g/cm^{3}
98 Cf californium
use	15.1 g/cm^{3}
WEL	(near r.t.) 15100 kg/m^{3}
CRC	(near r.t.) 15.1 g/cm^{3}
99 Es einsteinium
use	8.84 g/cm^{3}
LNG	(at r.t.) 8.84 g/cm^{3}

== Density, liquid phase ==
2 He helium-4
Donnelly et al.	0.1249772 g/cm^{3} (He-I at boiling point: 4.222 K)
Donnelly et al.	0.1461087 g/cm^{3} (at lambda transition He-I/He-II: 2.1768 K, saturated vapor pressure)
Donnelly et al.	0.1451397 g/cm^{3} (He-II superfluid at 0 K, saturated vapor pressure)
Hoffer et al.	0.17309 g/cm^{3} (from 23.125 cm^{3}/mole; He-II from hcp melt at 0 K, 25.00 atm)
Hoffer et al.	0.17308 g/cm^{3} (from 23.1256 cm^{3}/mole; at local min. density, from hcp melt at 0.699 K, 24.993 atm)
Hoffer et al.	0.17443 g/cm^{3} (from 22.947 cm^{3}/mole; He-II at triple point hcp−bcc−He-II: 1.463 K, 26.036 atm)
Hoffer et al.	0.1807 g/cm^{3} (from 22.150 cm^{3}/mole; He-I at triple point hcp−bcc−He-I: 1.772 K, 30.016 atm)
3 Li lithium
use	0.512 g/cm^{3}
CR2	(at m.p.) 0.512 g/cm^{3}
4 Be beryllium
use	1.690 g/cm^{3}
CR2	(at m.p.) 1.690 g/cm^{3}
5 B boron
use	2.08 g/cm^{3}
CR2	(at m.p.) 2.08 g/cm^{3}
11 Na sodium
use	0.927 g/cm^{3}
CR2	(at m.p.) 0.927 g/cm^{3}
12 Mg magnesium
use	1.584 g/cm^{3}
CR2	(at m.p.) 1.584 g/cm^{3}
13 Al aluminium
use	2.375 g/cm^{3}
CR2	(at m.p.) 2.375 g/cm^{3}
14 Si silicon
use	2.57 g/cm^{3}
CR2	(at m.p.) 2.57 g/cm^{3}
16 S sulfur
use	1.819 g/cm^{3}
CR2	(at m.p.) 1.819 g/cm^{3}
17 Cl chlorine
use	(at −35 °C) 1.5649 g/cm^{3}
LNG	(at −35 °C) 1.5649 g/cm^{3}
19 K potassium
use	0.828 g/cm^{3}
CR2	(at m.p.) 0.828 g/cm^{3}
20 Ca calcium
use	1.378 g/cm^{3}
CR2	(at m.p.) 1.378 g/cm^{3}
21 Sc scandium
use	2.80 g/cm^{3}
CR2	(at m.p.) 2.80 g/cm^{3}
22 Ti titanium
use	4.11 g/cm^{3}
CR2	(at m.p.) 4.11 g/cm^{3}
23 V vanadium
use	5.5 g/cm^{3}
CR2	(at m.p.) 5.5 g/cm^{3}
24 Cr chromium
use	6.3 g/cm^{3}
CR2	(at m.p.) 6.3 g/cm^{3}
25 Mn manganese
use	5.95 g/cm^{3}
CR2	(at m.p.) 5.95 g/cm^{3}
26 Fe iron
use	6.98 g/cm^{3}
CR2	(at m.p.) 6.98 g/cm^{3}
27 Co cobalt
use	7.75 g/cm^{3}
CR2	(at m.p.) 7.75 g/cm^{3}
28 Ni nickel
use	7.81 g/cm^{3}
CR2	(at m.p.) 7.81 g/cm^{3}
29 Cu copper
use	8.02 g/cm^{3}
CR2	(at m.p.) 8.02 g/cm^{3}
30 Zn zinc
use	6.57 g/cm^{3}
CR2	(at m.p.) 6.57 g/cm^{3}
31 Ga gallium
use	6.095 g/cm^{3}
LNG	(at 29.8 °C, m.p. is 29.7646 °C) 6.095 g/cm^{3}
CR2	(at m.p.) 6.08 g/cm^{3}
32 Ge germanium
use	5.60 g/cm^{3}
CR2	(at m.p.) 5.60 g/cm^{3}
33 As arsenic
use	5.22 g/cm^{3}
CR2	(at m.p.) 5.22 g/cm^{3}
34 Se selenium
use	3.99 g/cm^{3}
CR2	(at m.p.) 3.99 g/cm^{3}
35 Br bromine (Br_{2})
use	(near r.t.) 3.1028 g/cm^{3}
LNG	(at 25 °C) (3.1023 rel. to water at 4 °C)
CRC	(near r.t.) 3.1028 g/cm^{3}
37 Rb rubidium
use	1.46 g/cm^{3}
CR2	(at m.p.) 1.46 g/cm^{3}
38 Sr strontium
use	6.980 g/cm^{3}
CR2	(at m.p.) 6.980 g/cm^{3}
39 Y yttrium
use	4.24 g/cm^{3}
CR2	(at m.p.) 4.24 g/cm^{3}
40 Zr zirconium
use	5.8 g/cm^{3}
CR2	(at m.p.) 5.8 g/cm^{3}
42 Mo molybdenum
use	9.33 g/cm^{3}
CR2	(at m.p.) 9.33 g/cm^{3}
44 Ru ruthenium
use	10.65 g/cm^{3}
CR2	(at m.p.) 10.65 g/cm^{3}
45 Rh rhodium
use	10.7 g/cm^{3}
CR2	(at m.p.) 10.7 g/cm^{3}
46 Pd palladium
use	10.38 g/cm^{3}
CR2	(at m.p.) 10.38 g/cm^{3}
47 Ag silver
use	9.320 g/cm^{3}
CR2	(at m.p.) 9.320 g/cm^{3}
48 Cd cadmium
use	7.996 g/cm^{3}
CR2	(at m.p.) 7.996 g/cm^{3}
49 In indium
use	7.02 g/cm^{3}
CR2	(at m.p.) 7.02 g/cm^{3}
50 Sn tin
use	6.99 g/cm^{3}
CR2	(at m.p.) 6.99 g/cm^{3}
51 Sb antimony
use	6.53 g/cm^{3}
CR2	(at m.p.) 6.53 g/cm^{3}
52 Te tellurium
use	5.70 g/cm^{3}
CR2	(at m.p.) 5.70 g/cm^{3}
55 Cs caesium
use	1.843 g/cm^{3}
CR2	(at m.p. (28.44 °C, near r.t.)) 1.843 g/cm^{3}
56 Ba barium
use	3.338 g/cm^{3}
CR2	(at m.p.) 3.338 g/cm^{3}
57 La lanthanum
use	5.94 g/cm^{3}
CR2	(at m.p.) 5.94 g/cm^{3}
58 Ce cerium
use	6.55 g/cm^{3}
CR2	(at m.p.) 6.55 g/cm^{3}
59 Pr praseodymium
use	6.50 g/cm^{3}
CR2	(at m.p.) 6.50 g/cm^{3}
60 Nd neodymium
use	6.89 g/cm^{3}
CR2	(at m.p.) 6.89 g/cm^{3}
62 Sm samarium
use	7.16 g/cm^{3}
CR2	(at m.p.) 7.16 g/cm^{3}
63 Eu europium
use	5.13 g/cm^{3}
CR2	(at m.p.) 5.13 g/cm^{3}
64 Gd gadolinium
use	7.4 g/cm^{3}
CR2	(at m.p.) 7.4 g/cm^{3}
65 Tb terbium
use	7.65 g/cm^{3}
CR2	(at m.p.) 7.65 g/cm^{3}
66 Dy dysprosium
use	8.37 g/cm^{3}
CR2	(at m.p.) 8.37 g/cm^{3}
67 Ho holmium
use	8.34 g/cm^{3}
CR2	(at m.p.) 8.34 g/cm^{3}
68 Er erbium
use	8.86 g/cm^{3}
CR2	(at m.p.) 8.86 g/cm^{3}
69 Tm thulium
use	8.56 g/cm^{3}
CR2	(at m.p.) 8.56 g/cm^{3}
70 Yb ytterbium
use	6.21 g/cm^{3}
CR2	(at m.p.) 6.21 g/cm^{3}
71 Lu lutetium
use	9.3 g/cm^{3}
CR2	(at m.p.) 9.3 g/cm^{3}
72 Hf hafnium
use	12 g/cm^{3}
CR2	(at m.p.) 12 g/cm^{3}
73 Ta tantalum
use	15 g/cm^{3}
CR2	(at m.p.) 15 g/cm^{3}
74 W tungsten
use	17.6 g/cm^{3}
CR2	(at m.p.) 17.6 g/cm^{3}
75 Re rhenium
use	18.9 g/cm^{3}
CR2	(at m.p.) 18.9 g/cm^{3}
76 Os osmium
use	20 g/cm^{3}
CR2	(at m.p.) 20 g/cm^{3}
77 Ir iridium
use	19 g/cm^{3}
CR2	(at m.p.) 19 g/cm^{3}
78 Pt platinum
use	19.77 g/cm^{3}
CR2	(at m.p.) 19.77 g/cm^{3}
79 Au gold
use	17.31 g/cm^{3}
CR2	(at m.p.) 17.31 g/cm^{3}
80 Hg mercury
use	(at r.t.) 13.534 g/cm^{3}
LNG	(at r.t.) 13.534 g/cm^{3}
CRC	(near r.t.) 13.5336 g/cm^{3}
81 Tl thallium
use	11.22 g/cm^{3}
CR2	(at m.p.) 11.22 g/cm^{3}
82 Pb lead
use	10.66 g/cm^{3}
CR2	(at m.p.) 10.66 g/cm^{3}
83 Bi bismuth
use	10.05 g/cm^{3}
CR2	(at m.p.) 10.05 g/cm^{3}
92 U uranium
use	17.3 g/cm^{3}
CR2	(at m.p.) 17.3 g/cm^{3}
94 Pu plutonium
use	16.63 g/cm^{3}
CR2	(at m.p.) 16.63 g/cm^{3}

== Density, gas phase ==
	value	conditions
1 H hydrogen (H_{2})
use	0.08988 g/L	0 °C, 101.325 kPa
CRC	(calc. ideal gas) 0.082 g/L	25 °C, 101.325 kPa
KCH	0.08988 kg/m^{3}	0 °C, 101.3 kPa
VDW	0.08988 g/L	0 °C, 101.325 kPa
VDW	(lit. source) 0.08988 g/L	
2 He helium
use	0.1786 g/L	0 °C, 101.325 kPa
CRC	(calc. ideal gas) 0.164 g/L	25 °C, 101.325 kPa
LNG	0.176 g/L	room temperature
KCH	0.1785 kg/m^{3}	0 °C, 101.3 kPa
VDW	0.1786 g/L	0 °C, 101.325 kPa
VDW	(lit. source) 0.1785 g/L	0 °C, 1 atm
7 N nitrogen (N_{2})
use	1.251 g/L	0 °C, 101.325 kPa
CRC	(calc. ideal gas) 1.145 g/L	25 °C, 101.325 kPa
LNG	1.165 g/L	20 °C
KCH	1.2505 kg/m^{3}	0 °C, 101.3 kPa
VDW	1.251 g/L	0 °C, 101.325 kPa
VDW	(lit. source) 1.2506 g/L	
8 O oxygen (O_{2})
use	1.429 g/L	0 °C, 101.325 kPa
CRC	(calc. ideal gas) 1.308 g/L	25 °C, 101.325 kPa
LNG	1.331 g/L	20 °C
KCH	1.42895 kg/m^{3}	0 °C, 101.3 kPa
VDW	1.429 g/L	0 °C, 101.325 kPa
VDW	(lit. source) 1.429 g/L	0 °C
9 F fluorine (F_{2})
use	1.7 g/L	0 °C, 101.325 kPa
CRC	(calc. ideal gas) 1.553 g/L	25 °C, 101.325 kPa
VDW	(lit. source) 1.696 g/L	
	1.6074 kg/m^{3}	15 °C, 1.013 bar
	0.0983 lb/ft^{3}	70 °F (21 °C), 1 atm
10 Ne neon
use	0.9002 g/L	0 °C, 101.325 kPa
CRC	(calc. ideal gas) 0.825 g/L	25 °C, 101.325 kPa
LNG	0.8999 g/L	0 °C
KCH	0.9002 kg/m^{3}	0 °C, 101.3 kPa
VDW	0.9002 g/L	0 °C, 101.325 kPa
VDW	(lit. source) 0.89990 g/L	0 °C, 1 atm
17 Cl chlorine (Cl_{2})
use	3.2 g/L	0 °C, 101.325 kPa
CRC	(calc. ideal gas) 2.898 g/L	25 °C, 101.325 kPa
LNG	2.98 g/L	20 °C
KCH	3.214 kg/m^{3}	0 °C, 101.3 kPa
VDW	3.116 g/L	0 °C, 101.325 kPa
VDW	(lit. source) 3.214 g/L	
18 Ar argon
use	1.784 g/L	0 °C, 101.325 kPa
CRC	(calc. ideal gas) 1.633 g/L	25 °C, 101.325 kPa
LNG	1.7824 g/L	0 °C
KCH	1.784 kg/m^{3}	0 °C, 101.3 kPa
VDW	1.784 g/L	0 °C, 101.325 kPa
VDW	(lit. source) 1.7837 g/L	
36 Kr krypton
use	3.749 g/L	0 °C, 101.325 kPa
CRC	(calc. ideal gas) 3.425 g/L	25 °C, 101.325 kPa
LNG	3.7493 g/L	room temperature
KCH	3.744 kg/m^{3}	0 °C, 101.3 kPa
VDW	3.749 g/L	0 °C, 101.325 kPa
VDW	(lit. source) 3.733 g/L	0 °C
54 Xe xenon
use	5.894 g/L	0 °C, 101.325 kPa
CRC	(calc. ideal gas) 5.366 g/L	25 °C, 101.325 kPa
LNG	5.761 g/L	room temperature
KCH	5.897 kg/m^{3}	0 °C, 101.3 kPa
VDW	5.894 g/L	0 °C, 101.325 kPa
VDW	(lit. source) 5.88 g/L	
86 Rn radon (Radon-222 ?)
use	9.73 g/L	0 °C, 101.325 kPa
CRC	(calc. ideal gas) 9.074 g/L	25 °C, 101.325 kPa
LNG	9.73 g/L	room temperature
VDW	(lit. source) 9.73 g/L	
ICT.a	9.73 g/L	0 °C, 1 A_{n} (=101.325 kPa) formula weight = 222

== Notes ==
- The suggested values for solid densities refer to "near room temperature (r.t.)" by default.
- The suggested values for liquid densities refer to "at the melting point (m.p.)" by default.

== See also ==
- Hardnesses of the elements (data page)

	van der Waals constants		25 °C, 100.0 kPa		0 °C, 1 atm		Lit.
	a (L^{2}⋅bar/mol^{2})	b (L/mol)	V_{m} (L)	d (g/L)	V_{m} (L)	d (g/L)	d (g/L)
Argon	1.363	0.03219	24.77	1.613	22.39	1.784	1.7837
Chlorine	6.579	0.05622	25.11	2.824	22.75	3.116	3.214
Fluorine	not available						1.696
Helium	0.03457	0.02370	24.81	0.1613	22.44	0.1786	0.1785 (0 °C, 1 atm)
Hydrogen	0.2476	0.02661	24.81	0.08127	22.43	0.08988	0.08988
Krypton	2.349	0.03978	24.73	3.388	22.35	3.749	3.733 (0 °C)
Neon	0.2135	0.01709	24.80	0.8139	22.42	0.9002	0.89990 (0 °C, 1 atm)
Nitrogen	1.408	0.03913	24.77	1.131	22.39	1.251	1.2506
Oxygen	1.378	0.03183	24.77	1.292	22.39	1.429	1.429 (0 °C)
Radon	not available						9.73
Xenon	4.250	0.05105	24.69	5.323	22.28	5.894	5.88
