= Outline of chemistry =

Overview of and topical guide to chemistry

The following outline acts as an overview of and topical guide to chemistry:

Chemistry is the study of the properties and behavior of matter that is composed of chemical elements. Investigations on matter range from physical and chemical properties, structure, composition, behavior, and changes as they relate to the chemical reactions. Chemistry is centrally concerned with atoms and their interactions with other atoms, and particularly with the properties of chemical bonds.

== Summary ==
Chemistry can be described as all of the following:

- An academic discipline – one with academic departments, curricula and degrees; national and international societies; and specialized journals.
- A scientific field (a branch of science) – widely recognized category of specialized expertise within science, and typically embodies its own terminology and nomenclature. Such a field will usually be represented by one or more scientific journals, where peer-reviewed research is published. There are several chemistry-related scientific journals.
  - A natural science – one that seeks to elucidate the rules that govern the natural world using empirical and scientific method.
    - A physical science – one that studies non-living systems.
    - A biological science – one that studies the role of chemicals and chemical processes in living organisms. See Outline of biochemistry.

== Branches ==
- Physical chemistry – study of the physical and fundamental basis of chemical systems and processes. In particular, the energetics and dynamics of such systems and processes are of interest to physical chemists. Important areas of study include chemical thermodynamics, chemical kinetics, electrochemistry, statistical mechanics, spectroscopy, and more recently, astrochemistry. Physical chemistry has large overlap with molecular physics. Physical chemistry involves the use of infinitesimal calculus in deriving equations. It is usually associated with quantum chemistry and theoretical chemistry. Physical chemistry is a distinct discipline from chemical physics, but again, there is very strong overlap.
  - Chemical kinetics – study of rates of chemical processes.
  - Chemical physics – investigates physicochemical phenomena using techniques from atomic and molecular physics and condensed matter physics; it is the branch of physics that studies chemical processes.
  - Electrochemistry – branch of chemistry that studies chemical reactions which take place in a solution at the interface of an electron conductor (the electrode: a metal or a semiconductor) and an ionic conductor (the electrolyte), and which involve electron transfer between the electrode and the electrolyte or species in solution.
  - Femtochemistry – area of physical chemistry that studies chemical reactions on extremely short timescales, approximately 10^{−15} seconds (one femtosecond).
  - Geochemistry – chemical study of the mechanisms behind major systems studied in geology.
  - Photochemistry – study of chemical reactions that proceed with the absorption of light by atoms or molecules.
  - Quantum chemistry – branch of chemistry whose primary focus is the application of quantum mechanics in physical models and experiments of chemical systems.
  - Solid-state chemistry – study of the synthesis, structure, and properties of solid phase materials, particularly, but not necessarily exclusively of, non-molecular solids.
  - Spectroscopy – study of the interaction between matter and radiated energy.
  - Stereochemistry – study of the relative spatial arrangement of atoms that form the structure of molecules
  - Surface science – study of physical and chemical phenomena that occur at the interface of two phases, including solid–liquid interfaces, solid–gas interfaces, solid–vacuum interfaces, and liquid-gas interfaces.
  - Thermochemistry – the branch of chemistry that studies the relation between chemical action and the amount of heat absorbed or generated.
    - Calorimetry – the study of heat changes in physical and chemical processes.
- Organic chemistry (outline) – study of the structure, properties, composition, mechanisms, and reactions of organic compounds. An organic compound is defined as any compound based on a carbon skeleton.
  - Biochemistry – study of the chemicals, chemical reactions and chemical interactions that take place in living organisms. Biochemistry and organic chemistry are closely related, as in medicinal chemistry or neurochemistry. Biochemistry is also associated with molecular biology and genetics.
    - Neurochemistry – study of neurochemicals; including transmitters, peptides, proteins, lipids, sugars, and nucleic acids; their interactions, and the roles they play in forming, maintaining, and modifying the nervous system.
    - Molecular biochemistry and genetic engineering – an area of biochemistry and molecular biology that studies the genes, their heritage and their expression.
  - Bioorganic chemistry – combines organic chemistry and biochemistry toward biology.
  - Biophysical chemistry – is a physical science that uses the concepts of physics and physical chemistry for the study of biological systems.
  - Medicinal chemistry – discipline which applies chemistry for medical or drug related purposes.
  - Organometallic chemistry – is the study of organometallic compounds, chemical compounds containing at least one chemical bond between a carbon atom of an organic molecule and a metal, including alkaline, alkaline earth, and transition metals, and sometimes broadened to include metalloids like boron, silicon, and tin.
  - Physical organic chemistry – study of the interrelationships between structure and reactivity in organic molecules.
- Inorganic chemistry – study of the properties and reactions of inorganic compounds. The distinction between organic and inorganic disciplines is not absolute and there is much overlap, most importantly in the sub-discipline of organometallic chemistry.
  - Bioinorganic chemistry – is a field that examines the role of metals in biology.
  - Cluster chemistry – focuses on crystalline materials most often existing on the 0–2 nanometer scale and characterizing their crystal structures and understanding their role in the nucleation and growth mechanisms of larger materials.
- Nuclear chemistry – study of how subatomic particles come together and make nuclei. Modern transmutation is a large component of nuclear chemistry, and the table of nuclides is an important result and tool for this field.
- Analytical chemistry – analysis of material samples to gain an understanding of their chemical composition and structure. Analytical chemistry incorporates standardized experimental methods in chemistry. These methods may be used in all subdisciplines of chemistry, excluding purely theoretical chemistry.

Other

- Astrochemistry – study of the abundance and reactions of chemical elements and molecules in the universe, and their interaction with radiation.
  - Cosmochemistry – study of the chemical composition of matter in the universe and the processes that led to those compositions.
- Computational chemistry – is a branch of chemistry that uses computer simulations for solving chemical problems.
- Environmental chemistry – study of chemical and biochemical phenomena that occur diverse aspects of the environment such the air, soil, and water. It also studies the effects of human activity on the environment.
- Green chemistry is a philosophy of chemical research and engineering that encourages the design of products and processes that minimize the use and generation of hazardous substances.
- Supramolecular chemistry – refers to the domain of chemistry beyond that of molecules and focuses on the chemical systems made up of a discrete number of assembled molecular subunits or components.
- Theoretical chemistry – study of chemistry via fundamental theoretical reasoning (usually within mathematics or physics). In particular the application of quantum mechanics to chemistry is called quantum chemistry. Since the end of the Second World War, the development of computers has allowed a systematic development of computational chemistry, which is the art of developing and applying computer programs for solving chemical problems. Theoretical chemistry has large overlap with (theoretical and experimental) condensed matter physics and molecular physics.
- Polymer chemistry – multidisciplinary science that deals with the chemical synthesis and chemical properties of polymers or macromolecules.
- Wet chemistry – is a form of analytical chemistry that uses classical methods such as observation to analyze materials usually in liquid phase.
- Agrochemistry – study and application of both chemistry and biochemistry for agricultural production, the processing of raw products into foods and beverages, and environmental monitoring and remediation.
- Atmospheric chemistry – branch of atmospheric science which studies the chemistry of the Earth's atmosphere and that of other planets.
- Chemical biology – scientific discipline spanning the fields of chemistry and biology and involves the application of chemical techniques and tools, often compounds produced through synthetic chemistry, to analyze and manipulation of biological systems.
- Chemo-informatics – use of computer and informational techniques applied to a range of problems in the field of chemistry.
- Flow chemistry – study of chemical reactions in continuous flow, not as stationary batches, in industry and macro processing equipment.
- Immunohistochemistry – involves the process of detecting antigens (e.g., proteins) in cells of a tissue section by exploiting the principle of antibodies binding specifically to antigens in biological tissues.
- Immunochemistry – is a branch of chemistry that involves the study of the reactions and components on the immune system.
- Chemical oceanography – study of ocean chemistry: the behavior of the chemical elements within the Earth's oceans.
- Mathematical chemistry – area of study engaged in novel applications of mathematics to chemistry. It concerns itself principally with the mathematical modeling of chemical phenomena.
- Mechanochemistry – coupling of mechanical and chemical phenomena on a molecular scale.
- Molecular biology – study of interactions between the various systems of a cell. It overlaps with biochemistry.
- Petrochemistry – study of the transformation of petroleum and natural gas into useful products or raw materials.
- Phytochemistry – study of phytochemicals which come from plants.
- Radiochemistry – chemistry of radioactive materials.
- Sonochemistry – study of effect of sonic waves and wave properties on chemical systems.
- Synthetic chemistry – study of chemical synthesis.

== History ==
History of chemistry

- Precursors to chemistry
  - Alchemy (outline)
    - History of alchemy
- History of the branches of chemistry
  - History of analytical chemistry – history of the study of separation, identification, and quantification of the chemical components of natural and artificial materials.
  - History of cosmochemistry – history of the study of the chemical composition of matter in the universe and the processes that led to those compositions
  - History of atmospheric chemistry – history of the branch of atmospheric science in which the chemistry of the Earth's atmosphere and that of other planets is studied. It is a multidisciplinary field of research and draws on environmental chemistry, physics, meteorology, computer modeling, oceanography, geology and volcanology and other disciplines
  - History of biochemistry – history of the study of chemical processes in living organisms, including, but not limited to, living matter. Biochemistry governs all living organisms and living processes.
    - History of agrochemistry – history of the study of both chemistry and biochemistry which are important in agricultural production, the processing of raw products into foods and beverages, and in environmental monitoring and remediation.
    - History of bioinorganic chemistry – history of the examination of the role of metals in biology.
    - History of bioorganic chemistry – history of the rapidly growing scientific discipline that combines organic chemistry and biochemistry.
    - History of biophysical chemistry – history of the new branch of chemistry that covers a broad spectrum of research activities involving biological systems.
    - History of environmental chemistry – history of the scientific study of the chemical and biochemical phenomena that occur in natural places.
    - History of immunochemistry – history of the branch of chemistry that involves the study of the reactions and components of the immune system.
    - History of medicinal chemistry – history of the discipline at the intersection of chemistry, especially synthetic organic chemistry, and pharmacology and various other biological specialties, where they are involved with design, chemical synthesis and development for market of pharmaceutical agents (drugs).
    - History of natural product chemistry – history of the scientific study of chemical compounds or substances produced by living organisms—history of chemical compounds found in nature that usually have a pharmacological or biological activity for use in pharmaceutical drug discovery and drug design.
    - History of neurochemistry – history of the specific study of neurochemicals, which include neurotransmitters and other molecules such as neuro-active drugs that influence neuron function.
  - History of computational chemistry – history of the branch of chemistry that uses principles of computer science to assist in solving chemical problems.
    - History of chemo-informatics – history of the use of computer and informational techniques, applied to a range of problems in the field of chemistry.
    - History of molecular mechanics – history of the uses of Newtonian mechanics to model molecular systems.
  - History of flavor chemistry – history of the use of chemistry to engineer artificial and natural flavors.
  - History of flow chemistry – history of chemical reactions run in a continuously flowing stream rather than in batch production.
  - History of geochemistry – history of the study of the mechanisms behind major geological systems using chemistry
    - History of aqueous geochemistry – history of the study of the role of various elements in watersheds, including copper, sulfur, mercury, and how elemental fluxes are exchanged through atmospheric-terrestrial-aquatic interactions
    - History of isotope geochemistry – history of the study of the relative and absolute concentrations of the elements and their isotopes using chemistry and geology
    - History of ocean chemistry – history of the study the chemistry of marine environments, including the influences of different variables.
    - History of organic geochemistry – history of the study of the impacts and processes that organisms have had on Earth
    - History of regional, environmental and exploration geochemistry – history of the study of the spatial variation in the chemical composition of materials at the surface of the Earth
  - History of inorganic chemistry – history of the branch of chemistry concerned with the properties and behavior of inorganic compounds.
  - History of nuclear chemistry – history of the subfield of chemistry dealing with radioactivity, nuclear processes and nuclear properties.
    - History of radiochemistry – history of the chemistry of radioactive materials, where radioactive isotopes of elements are used to study the properties and chemical reactions of non-radioactive isotopes (often within radiochemistry the absence of radioactivity leads to a substance being described as being inactive as the isotopes are stable).
  - History of organic chemistry – history of the study of the structure, properties, composition, reactions, and preparation (by synthesis or by other means) of carbon-based compounds, hydrocarbons, and their derivatives.
    - History of petrochemistry – history of the branch of chemistry that studies the transformation of crude oil (petroleum) and natural gas into useful products or raw materials.
  - History of organometallic chemistry – history of the study of chemical compounds containing bonds between carbon and a metal.
  - History of photochemistry – history of the study of chemical reactions that proceed with the absorption of light by atoms or molecules.
  - History of physical chemistry – history of the study of macroscopic, atomic, subatomic, and particulate phenomena in chemical systems in terms of physical laws and concepts.
    - History of chemical kinetics – history of the study of rates of chemical processes.
    - History of chemical thermodynamics – history of the study of the interrelation of heat and work with chemical reactions or with physical changes of state within the confines of the laws of thermodynamics.
    - History of electrochemistry – history of the branch of chemistry that studies chemical reactions which take place in a solution at the interface of an electron conductor (a metal or a semiconductor) and an ionic conductor (the electrolyte), and which involve electron transfer between the electrode and the electrolyte or species in solution.
    - History of femtochemistry – history of the science that studies chemical reactions on extremely short timescales, approximately 10^{−15} seconds (one femtosecond, hence the name).
    - History of mathematical chemistry – history of the area of research engaged in novel applications of mathematics to chemistry; it concerns itself principally with the mathematical modeling of chemical phenomena.
    - History of mechanochemistry – history of the coupling of the mechanical and the chemical phenomena on a molecular scale and includes mechanical breakage, chemical behaviour of mechanically stressed solids (e.g., stress-corrosion cracking), tribology, polymer degradation under shear, cavitation-related phenomena (e.g., sonochemistry and sonoluminescence), shock wave chemistry and physics, and even the burgeoning field of molecular machines.
    - History of physical organic chemistry – history of the study of the interrelationships between structure and reactivity in organic molecules.
    - History of quantum chemistry – history of the branch of chemistry whose primary focus is the application of quantum mechanics in physical models and experiments of chemical systems.
    - History of sonochemistry – history of the study of the effect of sonic waves and wave properties on chemical systems.
    - History of stereochemistry – history of the study of the relative spatial arrangement of atoms within molecules.
    - History of supramolecular chemistry – history of the area of chemistry beyond the molecules and focuses on the chemical systems made up of a discrete number of assembled molecular subunits or components.
    - History of thermochemistry – history of the study of energy and heat associated with chemical reactions and/or physical transformations.
  - History of phytochemistry – history of the study of phytochemicals.
  - History of polymer chemistry – history of the multidisciplinary science that deals with the chemical synthesis and chemical properties of polymers or macromolecules.
  - History of solid-state chemistry – history of the study of the synthesis, structure, and properties of solid phase materials, particularly, but not necessarily exclusively of, non-molecular solids
  - History of multidisciplinary fields involving chemistry:
    - History of chemical biology – history of the scientific discipline spanning the fields of chemistry and biology that involves the application of chemical techniques and tools, often compounds produced through synthetic chemistry, to the study and manipulation of biological systems.
    - History of chemical oceanography – history of the study of the behavior of chemical elements within the Earth's oceans.
    - History of chemical physics – history of the branch of physics that studies chemical processes from the point of view of physics and engineering.
    - History of oenology – history of the science and study of all aspects of wine and winemaking except vine-growing and grape-harvesting, which is a subfield called viticulture.
    - History of spectroscopy – history of the study of the interaction between matter and radiated energy
    - History of surface science – history of the study of physical and chemical phenomena that occur at the interface of two phases, including solid–liquid interfaces, solid–gas interfaces, solid–vacuum interfaces, and liquid–gas interfaces.
- History of chemicals
  - History of chemical elements - The concept of an "element" as an indivisible substance has developed through three major historical phases: Classical definitions (such as those of the ancient Greeks), chemical definitions, and atomic definitions.
    - History of carbon
    - History of hydrogen
      - Timeline of hydrogen technologies
    - History of oxygen
  - History of chemical products
    - History of aspirin
    - History of cosmetics
    - History of gunpowder
    - History of pharmaceutical drugs
    - History of vitamins
- History of chemical processes
  - History of manufactured gas
    - History of the Haber process
- History of the chemical industry
  - History of the petroleum industry
  - History of the pharmaceutical industry
- History of the periodic table

== Chemicals ==
- Dictionary of chemical formulas
- List of biomolecules
- List of inorganic compounds
- Periodic table

== Atomic theory ==
Atomic theory

- Atomic models
  - Atomism – natural philosophy that theorizes that the world is composed of indivisible pieces.
  - Plum pudding model
  - Rutherford model
  - Bohr model

== Thermochemistry ==
Thermochemistry

=== Terminology ===
- Thermochemistry
- Chemical kinetics – the study of the rates of chemical reactions and investigates how different experimental conditions can influence the speed of a chemical reaction and yield information about the reaction's mechanism and transition states, as well as the construction of mathematical models that can describe the characteristics of a chemical reaction.
- Exothermic – a process or reaction in which the system releases energy to its surroundings in the form of heat. They are denoted by negative heat flow.
- Endothermic – a process or reaction in which the system absorbs energy from its surroundings in the form of heat. They are denoted by positive heat flow.
- Thermochemical equation
- Enthalpy change – internal energy of a system plus the product of pressure and volume. Its change in a system is equal to the heat brought to the system at constant pressure.
- Enthalpy of reaction
- Temperature – an objective comparative measure of heat.
- Calorimeter – an object used for calorimetry, or the process of measuring the heat of chemical reactions or physical changes as well as heat capacity.
- Heat – A form of energy associated with the kinetic energy of atoms or molecules and capable of being transmitted through solid and fluid media by conduction, through fluid media by convection, and through empty space by radiation.
- Joule – a unit of energy.
- Calorie
- Specific heat
- Specific heat capacity
- Latent heat
- Heat of fusion
- Heat of vaporization
- Collision theory
- Activation energy
- Activated complex
- Reaction rate
- Catalyst

=== Thermochemical equations ===
- Chemical equations that include the heat involved in a reaction, either on the reactant side or the product side.
- Examples:
  - H_{2}O(l) + 240kJ → H_{2}O(g)
  - N_{2} + 3H_{2} → 2NH_{3} + 92kJ
- Joule (J)

== Chemists ==
For more chemists, see: Nobel Prize in Chemistry and List of chemists

- Amedeo Avogadro
- Elias James Corey
- Marie Curie
- John Dalton
- Humphry Davy
- George Eastman
- Michael Faraday
- Rosalind Franklin
- Eleuthère Irénée du Pont
- Dmitriy Mendeleyev
- Alfred Nobel
- Wilhelm Ostwald
- Louis Pasteur
- Linus Pauling
- Joseph Priestley
- Robert Burns Woodward
- Karl Ziegler
- Ahmed Zewail

== Chemistry literature ==
- Scientific literature
- Scientific journal
- Academic journal
- List of important publications in chemistry
- List of scientific journals in chemistry
- List of science magazines
- Scientific American

== Lists ==
Chemical elements data references

- List of chemical elements – atomic mass, atomic number, symbol, name
- List of minerals – Minerals
- Electron configurations of the elements (data page) – electron configuration, electrons per shell
- Densities of the elements (data page) – density (solid, liquid, gas)
- Electron affinity (data page) – electron affinity
- Melting points of the elements (data page) – melting point
- Boiling points of the elements (data page) – boiling point
- Critical points of the elements (data page) – critical point
- Heats of fusion of the elements (data page) – heat of fusion
- Heats of vaporization of the elements (data page) – heat of vaporization
- Heat capacities of the elements (data page) – heat capacity
- Vapor pressures of the elements (data page) – vapor pressure
- Electronegativities of the elements (data page) – electronegativity (Pauling scale)
- Ionization energies of the elements (data page) – ionization energies (in eV) and molar ionization energies (in kJ/mol)
- Atomic radii of the elements (data page) – atomic radius (empirical), atomic radius (calculated), van der Waals radius, covalent radius
- Electrical resistivities of the elements (data page) – electrical resistivity
- Thermal conductivities of the elements (data page) – thermal conductivity
- Thermal expansion coefficients of the elements (data page) – thermal expansion
- Speeds of sound of the elements (data page) – speed of sound
- Elastic properties of the elements (data page) – Young's modulus, Poisson ratio, bulk modulus, shear modulus
- Hardnesses of the elements (data page) – Mohs hardness, Vickers hardness, Brinell hardness
- Abundances of the elements (data page) – Earth's crust, sea water, Sun and solar system
- List of oxidation states of the elements – oxidation states

List of compounds

- List of CAS numbers by chemical compound
- List of Extremely Hazardous Substances
- List of inorganic compounds
- List of organic compounds
- List of alkanes
- List of alloys

Other

- List of thermal conductivities
- List of purification methods in chemistry
- List of unsolved problems in chemistry

== See also ==
- Outline of biochemistry
- Outline of physics
