= List of data references for chemical elements =

The List of data references for chemical elements is divided into datasheets that give values for many properties of the elements, together with various references. Each datasheet is sequenced by atomic number.

== References for chemical elements ==
- List of chemical elements — with basic properties like standard atomic weight, m.p., b.p., abundance
- Abundance of the chemical elements
- Abundances of the elements (data page) — Earth's crust, sea water, Sun and Solar System
- Abundance of elements in Earth's crust
- Atomic radii of the elements (data page) — atomic radius (empirical), atomic radius (calculated), van der Waals radius, covalent radius
- Boiling points of the elements (data page) — Boiling point
- Critical points of the elements (data page) — Critical point
- Densities of the elements (data page) — Density (solid, liquid, gas)
- Elastic properties of the elements (data page) — Young's modulus, Poisson ratio, bulk modulus, shear modulus
- Electrical resistivities of the elements (data page) — Electrical resistivity
- Electron affinity (data page) — Electron affinity
- Electron configurations of the elements (data page) — Electron configuration of the gaseous atoms in the ground state
- Electronegativities of the elements (data page) — Electronegativity (Pauling scale)
- Hardnesses of the elements (data page) — Mohs hardness, Vickers hardness, Brinell hardness
- Heat capacities of the elements (data page) — Heat capacity
- Heats of fusion of the elements (data page) — Heat of fusion
- Heats of vaporization of the elements (data page) — Heat of vaporization
- Ionization energies of the elements (data page) — Ionization energy (in eV) and molar ionization energies (in kJ/mol)
- Melting points of the elements (data page) — Melting point
- Oxidation states of the elements — Oxidation state
- Speeds of sound of the elements (data page) — Speed of soundendfinscale
- Thermal conductivities of the elements (data page) — Thermal conductivity
- Thermal expansion coefficients of the elements (data page) — Thermal expansion
- Vapor pressures of the elements (data page) — Vapor pressure
