= Abundances of the elements (data page) =

Parts-per-million cube of relative abundance by mass of elements of the entire Earth down to around 1 ppm

== Earth bulk continental crust and upper continental crust ==
- C1 — Crust: CRC Handbook
- C2 — Crust: Kaye and Laby
- C3 — Crust: Greenwood
- C4 — Crust: Ahrens (Taylor)
- C5 — Crust: Ahrens (Wänke)
- C6 — Crust: Ahrens (Weaver)
- U1 — Upper crust: Ahrens (Taylor)
- U2 — Upper crust: Ahrens (Shaw)

Mass fraction, in kg/kg
Element	C1	C2	C3	C4	C5	C6	U1	U2
01 H hydrogen	1.40×10^{−3}		1.520×10^{−3}					
02 He helium	8×10^{−9}							
03 Li lithium	2.0×10^{−5}	2.0×10^{−5}	1.8×10^{−5}	1.3×10^{−5}	1.37×10^{−5}		2.0×10^{−5}	2.2×10^{−5}
04 Be beryllium	2.8×10^{−6}	2.0×10^{−6}	2×10^{−6}	1.500×10^{−6}			3.000×10^{−6}	
05 B boron	1.0×10^{−5}	7.0×10^{−6}	9×10^{−6}	1.0000×10^{−5}			1.5000×10^{−5}	
06 C carbon	2.00×10^{−4}		1.80×10^{−4}		3.76×10^{−3}			
07 N nitrogen	1.9×10^{−5}	2.0×10^{−5}	1.9×10^{−5}					
08 O oxygen	4.61×10^{−1}	3.7×10^{−1}	4.55000×10^{−1}					
09 F fluorine	5.85×10^{−4}	4.6×10^{−4}	5.44×10^{−4}		5.25×10^{−4}			
10 Ne neon	5×10^{−9}							
11 Na sodium	2.36×10^{−2}	2.3×10^{−2}	2.2700×10^{−2}	2.3000×10^{−2}	2.4400×10^{−2}	3.1000×10^{−2}	2.89×10^{−2}	2.57×10^{−2}
12 Mg magnesium	2.33×10^{−2}	2.8×10^{−2}	2.7640×10^{−2}	3.20×10^{−2}	2.37×10^{−2}	1.69×10^{−2}	1.33×10^{−2}	1.35×10^{−2}
13 Al aluminium	8.23×10^{−2}	8.0×10^{−2}	8.3000×10^{−2}	8.4100×10^{−2}	8.3050×10^{−2}	8.5200×10^{−2}	8.0400×10^{−2}	7.7400×10^{−2}
14 Si silicon	2.82×10^{−1}	2.7×10^{−1}	2.72000×10^{−1}	2.677×10^{−1}	2.81×10^{−1}	2.95×10^{−1}	3.08×10^{−1}	3.04×10^{−1}
15 P phosphorus	1.05×10^{−3}	1.0×10^{−3}	1.120×10^{−3}		7.63×10^{−4}	8.30×10^{−4}		
16 S sulfur	3.50×10^{−4}	3.0×10^{−4}	3.40×10^{−4}		8.81×10^{−4}			
17 Cl chlorine	1.45×10^{−4}	1.9×10^{−4}	1.26×10^{−4}		1.900×10^{−3}			
18 Ar argon	3.5×10^{−6}							
19 K potassium	2.09×10^{−2}	1.7×10^{−2}	1.8400×10^{−2}	9.100×10^{−3}	1.7600×10^{−2}	1.7000×10^{−2}	2.8000×10^{−2}	2.5700×10^{−2}
20 Ca calcium	4.15×10^{−2}	5.1×10^{−2}	4.6600×10^{−2}	5.2900×10^{−2}	4.9200×10^{−2}	3.4000×10^{−2}	3.0000×10^{−2}	2.9500×10^{−2}
21 Sc scandium	2.2×10^{−5}	2.2×10^{−5}	2.5×10^{−5}	3.0×10^{−5}	2.14×10^{−5}		1.1×10^{−5}	7×10^{−6}
22 Ti titanium	5.65×10^{−3}	8.6×10^{−3}	6.320×10^{−3}	5.400×10^{−3}	5.250×10^{−3}	3.600×10^{−3}	3.000×10^{−3}	3.120×10^{−3}
23 V vanadium	1.20×10^{−4}	1.7×10^{−4}	1.36×10^{−4}	2.30×10^{−4}	1.34×10^{−4}		6.0×10^{−5}	5.3×10^{−5}
24 Cr chromium	1.02×10^{−4}	9.6×10^{−5}	1.22×10^{−4}	1.85×10^{−4}	1.46×10^{−4}	5.6×10^{−5}	3.5×10^{−5}	3.5×10^{−5}
25 Mn manganese	9.50×10^{−4}	1.0×10^{−3}	1.060×10^{−3}	1.400×10^{−3}	8.47×10^{−4}	1.000×10^{−3}	6.00×10^{−4}	5.27×10^{−4}
26 Fe iron	5.63×10^{−2}	5.8×10^{−2}	6.2000×10^{−2}	7.07×10^{−2}	4.92×10^{−2}	3.8×10^{−2}	3.50×10^{−2}	3.09×10^{−2}
27 Co cobalt	2.5×10^{−5}	2.8×10^{−5}	2.9×10^{−5}	2.9×10^{−5}	2.54×10^{−5}		1.0×10^{−5}	1.2×10^{−5}
28 Ni nickel	8.4×10^{−5}	7.2×10^{−5}	9.9×10^{−5}	1.05×10^{−4}	6.95×10^{−5}	3.5×10^{−5}	2×10^{−5}	1.9×10^{−5}
29 Cu copper	6.0×10^{−5}	5.8×10^{−5}	6.8×10^{−5}	7.5×10^{−5}	4.7×10^{−5}		2.5×10^{−5}	1.4×10^{−5}
30 Zn zinc	7.0×10^{−5}	8.2×10^{−5}	7.6×10^{−5}	8.0×10^{−5}	7.6×10^{−5}		7.1×10^{−5}	5.2×10^{−5}
31 Ga gallium	1.9×10^{−5}	1.7×10^{−5}	1.9×10^{−5}	1.8×10^{−5}	1.86×10^{−5}		1.7×10^{−5}	1.4×10^{−5}
32 Ge germanium	1.5×10^{−6}	1.3×10^{−6}	1.5×10^{−6}	1.6×10^{−6}	1.32×10^{−6}		1.6×10^{−6}	
33 As arsenic	1.8×10^{−6}	2.0×10^{−6}	1.8×10^{−6}	1.0×10^{−6}	2.03×10^{−6}		1.5×10^{−6}	
34 Se selenium	5×10^{−8}	5×10^{−8}	5×10^{−8}	5×10^{−8}	1.53×10^{−7}		5×10^{−8}	
35 Br bromine	2.4×10^{−6}	4.0×10^{−6}	2.5×10^{−6}		6.95×10^{−6}			
36 Kr krypton	1×10^{−10}							
37 Rb rubidium	9.0×10^{−5}	7.0×10^{−5}	7.8×10^{−5}	3.2×10^{−5}	7.90×10^{−5}	6.1×10^{−5}	1.12×10^{−4}	1.10×10^{−4}
38 Sr strontium	3.70×10^{−4}	4.5×10^{−4}	3.84×10^{−4}	2.60×10^{−4}	2.93×10^{−4}	5.03×10^{−4}	3.50×10^{−4}	3.16×10^{−4}
39 Y yttrium	3.3×10^{−5}	3.5×10^{−7}	3.1×10^{−5}	2.0×10^{−5}		1.4×10^{−5}	2.2×10^{−5}	2.1×10^{−5}
40 Zr zirconium	1.65×10^{−4}	1.4×10^{−4}	1.62×10^{−4}	1.00×10^{−4}		2.10×10^{−4}	1.90×10^{−4}	2.40×10^{−4}
41 Nb niobium	2.0×10^{−5}	2.0×10^{−5}	2.0×10^{−5}	1.1000×10^{−5}		1.3000×10^{−5}	2.5000×10^{−5}	2.6000×10^{−5}
42 Mo molybdenum	1.2×10^{−6}	1.2×10^{−6}	1.2×10^{−6}	1.000×10^{−6}			1.500×10^{−6}	
43 Tc technetium								
44 Ru ruthenium	1×10^{−9}		1×10^{−10}					
45 Rh rhodium	1×10^{−9}		1×10^{−10}					
46 Pd palladium	1.5×10^{−8}	3×10^{−9}	1.5×10^{−8}	1.0×10^{−9}			5×10^{−10}	
47 Ag silver	7.5×10^{−8}	8×10^{−8}	8×10^{−8}	8.0×10^{−8}	6.95×10^{−8}		5.0×10^{−8}	
48 Cd cadmium	1.5×10^{−7}	1.8×10^{−7}	1.6×10^{−7}	9.8×10^{−8}	1.00×10^{−7}		9.8×10^{−8}	
49 In indium	2.5×10^{−7}	2×10^{−7}	2.4×10^{−7}	5.0×10^{−8}	6.95×10^{−8}		5.0×10^{−8}	
50 Sn tin	2.3×10^{−6}	1.5×10^{−6}	2.1×10^{−6}	2.500×10^{−6}			5.500×10^{−6}	
51 Sb antimony	2×10^{−7}	2×10^{−7}	2×10^{−7}	2.00×10^{−7}	2.03×10^{−7}		2.00×10^{−7}	
52 Te tellurium	1×10^{−9}		1×10^{−9}		2.03×10^{−9}			
53 I iodine	4.5×10^{−7}	5×10^{−7}	4.6×10^{−7}		1.540×10^{−6}			
54 Xe xenon	3×10^{−11}							
55 Cs caesium	3×10^{−6}	1.6×10^{−6}	2.6×10^{−6}	1.000×10^{−6}	1.310×10^{−6}		3.700×10^{−6}	
56 Ba barium	4.25×10^{−4}	3.8×10^{−4}	3.90×10^{−4}	2.50000×10^{−4}	5.42000×10^{−4}	7.07000×10^{−4}	5.50000×10^{−4}	1.070000×10^{−3}
57 La lanthanum	3.9×10^{−5}	5.0×10^{−5}	3.5×10^{−5}	1.6000×10^{−5}	2.9000×10^{−5}	2.8000×10^{−5}	3.0000×10^{−5}	3.200×10^{−6}
58 Ce cerium	6.65×10^{−5}	8.3×10^{−5}	6.6×10^{−5}	3.3000×10^{−5}	5.4200×10^{−5}	5.7000×10^{−5}	6.4000×10^{−5}	6.5000×10^{−5}
59 Pr praseodymium	9.2×10^{−6}	1.3×10^{−5}	9.1×10^{−6}	3.900×10^{−6}			7.100×10^{−6}	
60 Nd neodymium	4.15×10^{−5}	4.4×10^{−5}	4.0×10^{−5}	1.6000×10^{−5}	2.5400×10^{−5}	2.3000×10^{−5}	2.6000×10^{−5}	2.6000×10^{−5}
61 Pm promethium								
62 Sm samarium	7.05×10^{−6}	7.7×10^{−6}	7.0×10^{−6}	3.500×10^{−6}	5.590×10^{−6}	4.100×10^{−6}	4.500×10^{−6}	4.500×10^{−6}
63 Eu europium	2.0×10^{−6}	2.2×10^{−6}	2.1×10^{−6}	1.100×10^{−6}	1.407×10^{−6}	1.090×10^{−6}	8.80×10^{−7}	9.40×10^{−7}
64 Gd gadolinium	6.2×10^{−6}	6.3×10^{−6}	6.1×10^{−6}	3.300×10^{−6}	8.140×10^{−6}		3.800×10^{−6}	2.800×10^{−6}
65 Tb terbium	1.2×10^{−6}	1.0×10^{−6}	1.2×10^{−6}	6.00×10^{−7}	1.020×10^{−6}	5.30×10^{−7}	6.40×10^{−7}	4.80×10^{−7}
66 Dy dysprosium	5.2×10^{−6}	8.5×10^{−6}		3.700×10^{−6}	6.102×10^{−6}		3.500×10^{−6}	
67 Ho holmium	1.3×10^{−6}	1.6×10^{−6}	1.3×10^{−6}	7.80×10^{−7}	1.860×10^{−6}		8.00×10^{−7}	6.20×10^{−7}
68 Er erbium	3.5×10^{−6}	3.6×10^{−6}	3.5×10^{−6}	2.200×10^{−6}	3.390×10^{−6}		2.300×10^{−6}	
69 Tm thulium	5.2×10^{−7}	5.2×10^{−7}	5×10^{−7}	3.20×10^{−7}		2.40×10^{−7}	3.30×10^{−7}	
70 Yb ytterbium	3.2×10^{−6}	3.4×10^{−6}	3.1×10^{−6}	2.200×10^{−6}	3.390×10^{−6}	1.530×10^{−6}	2.200×10^{−6}	1.500×10^{−6}
71 Lu lutetium	8×10^{−7}	8×10^{−7}		3.00×10^{−7}	5.76×10^{−7}	2.30×10^{−7}	3.20×10^{−7}	2.30×10^{−7}
72 Hf hafnium	3.0×10^{−6}	4×10^{−6}	2.8×10^{−6}	3.000×10^{−6}	3.460×10^{−6}	4.700×10^{−6}	5.800×10^{−6}	5.800×10^{−6}
73 Ta tantalum	2.0×10^{−6}	2.4×10^{−6}	1.7×10^{−6}	1.000×10^{−6}	2.203×10^{−6}		2.200×10^{−6}	
74 W tungsten	1.25×10^{−6}	1.0×10^{−6}	1.2×10^{−6}	1.000×10^{−6}	1.310×10^{−6}		2.000×10^{−6}	
75 Re rhenium	7×10^{−10}	4×10^{−10}	7×10^{−10}	5×10^{−10}	1.02×10^{−9}		5×10^{−10}	
76 Os osmium	1.5×10^{−9}	2×10^{−10}	5×10^{−9}		1.02×10^{−9}			
77 Ir iridium	1×10^{−9}	2×10^{−10}	1×10^{−9}	1×10^{−10}	1.02×10^{−9}		2×10^{−11}	
78 Pt platinum	5×10^{−9}		1×10^{−8}					
79 Au gold	4×10^{−9}	2×10^{−9}	4×10^{−9}	3.0×10^{−9}	4.07×10^{−9}		1.8×10^{−9}	
80 Hg mercury	8.5×10^{−8}	2×10^{−8}	8×10^{−8}					
81 Tl thallium	8.5×10^{−7}	4.7×10^{−7}	7×10^{−7}	3.60×10^{−7}			7.50×10^{−7}	5.20×10^{−7}
82 Pb lead	1.4×10^{−5}	1.0×10^{−5}	1.3×10^{−5}	8.000×10^{−6}		1.5000×10^{−5}	2.0000×10^{−5}	1.7000×10^{−5}
83 Bi bismuth	8.5×10^{−9}	4×10^{−9}	8×10^{−9}	6.0×10^{−8}			1.27×10^{−7}	
84 Po polonium	2×10^{−16}							
85 At astatine								
86 Rn radon	4×10^{−19}							
87 Fr francium								
88 Ra radium	9×10^{−13}							
89 Ac actinium	5.5×10^{−16}							
90 Th thorium	9.6×10^{−6}	5.8×10^{−6}	8.1×10^{−6}	3.500×10^{−6}		5.700×10^{−6}	1.0700×10^{−5}	1.0000×10^{−5}
91 Pa protactinium	1.4×10^{−12}							
92 U uranium	2.7×10^{−6}	1.6×10^{−6}	2.3×10^{−6}	9.10×10^{−7}	1.200×10^{−6}	1.300×10^{−6}	2.800×10^{−6}	2.500×10^{−6}
93 Np neptunium								
94 Pu plutonium								

== Urban soils ==
The established abundances of chemical elements in urban soils can be considered a geochemical (ecological and geochemical) characteristic, the accumulated impact of technogenic and natural processes at the beginning of the 21st century. The figures estimate average concentrations of chemical elements in the soils of more than 300 cities and settlements in Europe, Asia, Africa, Australia, and America. Regardless of significant differences between abundances of several elements in urban soils and those values calculated for the Earth's crust, the element abundances in urban soils generally reflect those in the Earth's crust. With the development of technology the abundances may be refined.

Mass fraction, in mg/kg (ppm).

Element	Atomic number	Abundance in urban soils
Ag	47	0.37
Al	13	38200
As	33	15.9
B	5	45
Ba	56	853.12
Be	4	3.3
Bi	83	1.12
C	6	45100
Ca	20	53800
Cd	48	0.9
Cl	17	285
Co	27	14.1
Cr	24	80
Cs	55	5.0
Cu	29	39
Fe	26	22300
Ga	31	16.2
Ge	32	1.8
H	1	15000
Hg	80	0.88
K	19	13400
La	57	34
Li	3	49.5
Mg	12	7900
Mn	25	729
Mo	42	2.4
N	7	10000
Na	11	5800
Nb	41	15.7
Ni	28	33
O	8	490000
P	15	1200
Pb	82	54.5
Rb	37	58
S	16	1200
Sb	51	1.0
Sc	21	9.4
Si	14	289000
Sn	50	6.8
Sr	38	458
Ta	73	1.5
Ti	22	4758
Tl	81	1.1
V	23	104.9
W	74	2.9
Y	39	23.4
Yb	70	2.4
Zn	30	158
Zr	40	255.6

== Sea water ==
- W1 — CRC Handbook
- W2 — Kaye & Laby

Mass concentration, in kg/L. (The average density of sea water in the surface is 1.025 kg/L)

Element	W1	W2
1 H hydrogen	1.08×10^{−1}	1.1×10^{−1}
2 He helium	7×10^{−12}	7.2×10^{−12}
3 Li lithium	1.8×10^{−7}	1.7×10^{−7}
4 Be beryllium	5.6×10^{−12}	6×10^{−13}
5 B boron	4.44×10^{−6}	4.4×10^{−6}
6 C carbon	2.8×10^{−5}	2.8×10^{−5}
7 N nitrogen	5×10^{−7}	1.6×10^{−5}
8 O oxygen	8.57×10^{−1}	8.8×10^{−1}
9 F fluorine	1.3×10^{−6}	1.3×10^{−6}
10 Ne neon	1.2×10^{−10}	1.2×10^{−10}
11 Na sodium	1.08×10^{−2}	1.1×10^{−2}
12 Mg magnesium	1.29×10^{−3}	1.3×10^{−3}
13 Al aluminium	2×10^{−9}	1×10^{−9}
14 Si silicon	2.2×10^{−6}	2.9×10^{−6}
15 P phosphorus	6×10^{−8}	8.8×10^{−8}
16 S sulfur	9.05×10^{−4}	9.0×10^{−4}
17 Cl chlorine	1.94×10^{−2}	1.9×10^{−2}
18 Ar argon	4.5×10^{−7}	4.5×10^{−7}
19 K potassium	3.99×10^{−4}	3.9×10^{−4}
20 Ca calcium	4.12×10^{−4}	4.1×10^{−4}
21 Sc scandium	6×10^{−13}	< 4×10^{−12}
22 Ti titanium	1×10^{−9}	1×10^{−9}
23 V vanadium	2.5×10^{−9}	1.9×10^{−9}
24 Cr chromium	3×10^{−10}	2×10^{−10}
25 Mn manganese	2×10^{−10}	1.9×10^{−9}
26 Fe iron	2×10^{−9}	3.4×10^{−9}
27 Co cobalt	2×10^{−11}	3.9×10^{−10}
28 Ni nickel	5.6×10^{−10}	6.6×10^{−9}
29 Cu copper	2.5×10^{−10}	2.3×10^{−8}
30 Zn zinc	4.9×10^{−9}	1.1×10^{−8}
31 Ga gallium	3×10^{−11}	3×10^{−11}
32 Ge germanium	5×10^{−11}	6×10^{−11}
33 As arsenic	3.7×10^{−9}	2.6×10^{−9}
34 Se selenium	2×10^{−10}	9.0×10^{−11}
35 Br bromine	6.73×10^{−5}	6.7×10^{−5}
36 Kr krypton	2.1×10^{−10}	2.1×10^{−10}
37 Rb rubidium	1.2×10^{−7}	1.2×10^{−7}
38 Sr strontium	7.9×10^{−6}	8.1×10^{−6}
39 Y yttrium	1.3×10^{−11}	1.3×10^{−12}
40 Zr zirconium	3×10^{−11}	2.6×10^{−11}
41 Nb niobium	1×10^{−11}	1.5×10^{−11}
42 Mo molybdenum	1×10^{−8}	1.0×10^{−8}
43 Tc technetium		
44 Ru ruthenium	7×10^{−13}	
45 Rh rhodium		
46 Pd palladium		
47 Ag silver	4×10^{−11}	2.8×10^{−10}
48 Cd cadmium	1.1×10^{−10}	1.1×10^{−10}
49 In indium	2×10^{−8}	
50 Sn tin	4×10^{−12}	8.1×10^{−10}
51 Sb antimony	2.4×10^{−10}	3.3×10^{−10}
52 Te tellurium		
53 I iodine	6×10^{−8}	6.4×10^{−8}
54 Xe xenon	5×10^{−11}	4.7×10^{−11}
55 Cs caesium	3×10^{−10}	3.0×10^{−10}
56 Ba barium	1.3×10^{−8}	2.1×10^{−8}
57 La lanthanum	3.4×10^{−12}	3.4×10^{−12}
58 Ce cerium	1.2×10^{−12}	1.2×10^{−12}
59 Pr praseodymium	6.4×10^{−13}	6.4×10^{−13}
60 Nd neodymium	2.8×10^{−12}	2.8×10^{−12}
61 Pm promethium		
62 Sm samarium	4.5×10^{−13}	4.5×10^{−13}
63 Eu europium	1.3×10^{−13}	1.3×10^{−13}
64 Gd gadolinium	7×10^{−13}	7.0×10^{−13}
65 Tb terbium	1.4×10^{−13}	1.4×10^{−12}
66 Dy dysprosium	9.1×10^{−13}	9.1×10^{−13}
67 Ho holmium	2.2×10^{−13}	2.2×10^{−13}
68 Er erbium	8.7×10^{−13}	8.7×10^{−12}
69 Tm thulium	1.7×10^{−13}	1.7×10^{−13}
70 Yb ytterbium	8.2×10^{−13}	8.2×10^{−13}
71 Lu lutetium	1.5×10^{−13}	1.5×10^{−13}
72 Hf hafnium	7×10^{−12}	< 8×10^{−12}
73 Ta tantalum	2×10^{−12}	< 2.5×10^{−12}
74 W tungsten	1×10^{−10}	< 1×10^{−12}
75 Re rhenium	4×10^{−12}	
76 Os osmium		
77 Ir iridium		
78 Pt platinum		
79 Au gold	4×10^{−12}	1.1×10^{−11}
80 Hg mercury	3×10^{−11}	1.5×10^{−10}
81 Tl thallium	1.9×10^{−11}	
82 Pb lead	3×10^{−11}	3×10^{−11}
83 Bi bismuth	2×10^{−11}	2×10^{−11}
84 Po polonium	1.5×10^{−20}	
85 At astatine		
86 Rn radon	6×10^{−22}	
87 Fr francium		
88 Ra radium	8.9×10^{−17}	
89 Ac actinium		
90 Th thorium	1×10^{−12}	1.5×10^{−12}
91 Pa protactinium	5×10^{−17}	
92 U uranium	3.2×10^{−9}	3.3×10^{−9}
93 Np neptunium		
94 Pu plutonium		

== Sun and Solar System ==
- S1 — Sun: Kaye & Laby
- Y1 — Solar System: Kaye & Laby
- Y2 — Solar System: Ahrens, with (uncertainty %)

Atom mole fraction relative to silicon = 1.

Element	S1	Y1	Y2
01 H hydrogen	2.8×10^{4}	2.8×10^{4}*	2.79×10^{4}
02 He helium	2.7×10^{3}	2.7×10^{3}*	2.72×10^{3}
03 Li lithium	4.0×10^{−7}	5.7×10^{−5}	5.71×10^{−5} (9.2%)
04 Be beryllium	4.0×10^{−7}	7.0×10^{−7}	7.30×10^{−7} (9.5%)
05 B boron	1.1×10^{−5}	2.1×10^{−5}	2.12×10^{−5} (10%)
06 C carbon	1.0×10^{1}	1.0×10^{1}*	1.01×10^{1}
07 N nitrogen	3.1×10^{0}	3.1×10^{0}*	3.13×10^{0}
08 O oxygen	2.4×10^{1}	2.4×10^{1}*	2.38×10^{1} (10%)
09 F fluorine	about 1.0×10^{−3}	8.5×10^{−4}	8.43×10^{−4} (15%)
10 Ne neon	3.0×10^{0}	3.0×10^{0}*	3.44×10^{0} (14%)
11 Na sodium	6.0×10^{−2}	5.7×10^{−2}	5.74×10^{−2} (7.1%)
12 Mg magnesium	1.0×10^{0}	1.1×10^{0}	1.074×10^{0} (3.8%)
13 Al aluminium	8.3×10^{−2}	8.5×10^{−2}	8.49×10^{−2} (3.6%)
14 Si silicon	1.0×10^{0}	1.0×10^{0}	1.0×10^{0} (4.4%)
15 P phosphorus	8.0×10^{−3}	1.0×10^{−2}	1.04×10^{−2} (10%)
16 S sulfur	4.5×10^{−1}	5.2×10^{−1}	5.15×10^{−1} (13%)
17 Cl chlorine	about 9.0×10^{−3}	5.2×10^{−3}	5.24×10^{−3} (15%)
18 Ar argon	1.0×10^{−1}*	1.0×10^{−1}*	1.01×10^{−1} (6%)
19 K potassium	3.7×10^{−3}	3.8×10^{−3}	3.77×10^{−3} (7.7%)
20 Ca calcium	6.4×10^{−2}	6.1×10^{−2}	6.11×10^{−2} (7.1%)
21 Sc scandium	3.5×10^{−5}	3.4×10^{−5}	3.42×10^{−5} (8.6%)
22 Ti titanium	2.7×10^{−3}	2.4×10^{−3}	2.40×10^{−3} (5.0%)
23 V vanadium	2.8×10^{−4}	2.9×10^{−4}	2.93×10^{−4} (5.1%)
24 Cr chromium	1.3×10^{−2}	1.3×10^{−2}	1.35×10^{−2} (7.6%)
25 Mn manganese	6.9×10^{−3}	9.5×10^{−3}	9.55×10^{−3} (9.6%)
26 Fe iron	9.0×10^{−1}	9.0×10^{−1}	9.00×10^{−1} (2.7%)
27 Co cobalt	2.3×10^{−3}	2.3×10^{−3}	2.25×10^{−3} (6.6%)
28 Ni nickel	5.0×10^{−2}	5.0×10^{−2}	4.93×10^{−2} (5.1%)
29 Cu copper	4.5×10^{−4}	5.2×10^{−4}	5.22×10^{−4} (11%)
30 Zn zinc	1.1×10^{−3}	1.3×10^{−3}	1.26×10^{−3} (4.4%)
31 Ga gallium	2.1×10^{−5}	3.8×10^{−5}	3.78×10^{−5} (6.9%)
32 Ge germanium	7.2×10^{−5}	1.2×10^{−4}	1.19×10^{−4} (9.6%)
33 As arsenic		6.6×10^{−6}	6.56×10^{−6} (12%)
34 Se selenium		6.3×10^{−5}	6.21×10^{−5} (6.4%)
35 Br bromine		1.2×10^{−5}	1.18×10^{−5} (19%)
36 Kr krypton		4.8×10^{−5}	4.50×10^{−5} (18%)
37 Rb rubidium	1.1×10^{−5}	7.0×10^{−6}	7.09×10^{−6} (6.6%)
38 Sr strontium	2.2×10^{−5}	2.4×10^{−5}	2.35×10^{−5} (8.1%)
39 Y yttrium	4.9×10^{−6}	4.6×10^{−6}	4.64×10^{−6} (6.0%)
40 Zr zirconium	1.12×10^{−5}	1.14×10^{−5}	1.14×10^{−5} (6.4%)
41 Nb niobium	7.0×10^{−7}	7.0×10^{−7}	6.98×10^{−7} (1.4%)
42 Mo molybdenum	2.3×10^{−6}	2.6×10^{−6}	2.55×10^{−6} (5.5%)
43 Tc technetium			
44 Ru ruthenium	1.9×10^{−6}	1.9×10^{−6}	1.86×10^{−6} (5.4%)
45 Rh rhodium	4.0×10^{−7}	3.4×10^{−7}	3.44×10^{−7} (8%)
46 Pd palladium	1.4×10^{−6}	1.4×10^{−6}	1.39×10^{−6} (6.6%)
47 Ag silver	about 2.0×10^{−7}	4.9×10^{−7}	4.86×10^{−7} (2.9%)
48 Cd cadmium	2.0×10^{−6}	1.6×10^{−6}	1.61×10^{−6} (6.5%)
49 In indium	about 1.3×10^{−6}	1.9×10^{−7}	1.84×10^{−7} (6.4%)
50 Sn tin	about 3.0×10^{−6}	3.9×10^{−6}	3.82×10^{−6} (9.4%)
51 Sb antimony	about 3.0×10^{−7}	3.1×10^{−7}	3.09×10^{−7} (18%)
52 Te tellurium		4.9×10^{−6}	4.81×10^{−6} (10%)
53 I iodine		9.0×10^{−7}	9.00×10^{−7} (21%)
54 Xe xenon		4.8×10^{−6}	4.70×10^{−6} (20%)
55 Cs caesium		3.7×10^{−7}	3.72×10^{−7} (5.6%)
56 Ba barium	3.8×10^{−6}	4.5×10^{−6}	4.49×10^{−6} (6.3%)
57 La lanthanum	5.0×10^{−7}	4.4×10^{−7}	4.46×10^{−7} (2.0%)
58 Ce cerium	1.0×10^{−6}	1.1×10^{−6}	1.136×10^{−6} (1.7%)
59 Pr praseodymium	1.4×10^{−7}	1.7×10^{−7}	1.669×10^{−7} (2.4%)
60 Nd neodymium	9.0×10^{−7}	8.3×10^{−7}	8.279×10^{−7} (1.3%)
61 Pm promethium			
62 Sm samarium	3.0×10^{−7}	2.6×10^{−7}	2.582×10^{−7} (1.3%)
63 Eu europium	9.0×10^{−8}	9.7×10^{−8}	9.73×10^{−8} (1.6%)
64 Gd gadolinium	3.7×10^{−7}	3.3×10^{−7}	3.30×10^{−7} (1.4%)
65 Tb terbium	about 2.0×10^{−8}	6.0×10^{−8}	6.03×10^{−8} (2.2%)
66 Dy dysprosium	3.5×10^{−7}	4.0×10^{−7}	3.942×10^{−7} (1.4%)
67 Ho holmium	about 5.0×10^{−8}	8.9×10^{−8}	8.89×10^{−8} (2.4%)
68 Er erbium	2.4×10^{−7}	2.5×10^{−7}	2.508×10^{−7} (1.3%)
69 Tm thulium	about 3.0×10^{−8}	3.8×10^{−8}	3.78×10^{−8} (2.3%)
70 Yb ytterbium	3.4×10^{−7}	2.5×10^{−7}	2.479×10^{−7} (1.6%)
71 Lu lutetium	about 1.5×10^{−7}	3.7×10^{−8}	3.67×10^{−8} (1.3%)
72 Hf hafnium	2.1×10^{−7}	1.5×10^{−7}	1.54×10^{−7} (1.9%)
73 Ta tantalum		3.8×10^{−8}	2.07×10^{−8} (1.8%)
74 W tungsten	about 3.6×10^{−7}	1.3×10^{−7}	1.33×10^{−7} (5.1%)
75 Re rhenium		5.0×10^{−8}	5.17×10^{−8} (9.4%)
76 Os osmium	8.0×10^{−7}	6.7×10^{−7}	6.75×10^{−7} (6.3%)
77 Ir iridium	6.0×10^{−7}	6.6×10^{−7}	6.61×10^{−7} (6.1%)
78 Pt platinum	about 1.8×10^{−6}	1.34×10^{−6}	1.34×10^{−6} (7.4%)
79 Au gold	about 3.0×10^{−7}	1.9×10^{−7}	1.87×10^{−7} (15%)
80 Hg mercury		3.4×10^{−7}	3.40×10^{−7} (12%)
81 Tl thallium	about 2.0×10^{−7}	1.9×10^{−7}	1.84×10^{−7} (9.4%)
82 Pb lead	2.0×10^{−6}	3.1×10^{−6}	3.15×10^{−6} (7.8%)
83 Bi bismuth		1.4×10^{−7}	1.44×10^{−7} (8.2%)
84 Po polonium			
85 At astatine			
86 Rn radon			
87 Fr francium			
88 Ra radium			
89 Ac actinium			
90 Th thorium	5.0×10^{−8}	4.5×10^{−8}	3.35×10^{−8} (5.7%)
91 Pa protactinium			
92 U uranium		1.8×10^{−8}	9.00×10^{−9} (8.4%)
93 Np neptunium			
94 Pu plutonium			

== See also ==
- Chemical elements data references

== Notes ==
Due to the estimate nature of these values, no single recommendations are given. All values are normalized for these tables. Underlined zeroes indicate figures of indeterminable significance that were present in the source notation.
