= Heats of fusion of the elements =

Chemical data page

== Heat of fusion ==
	kJ/mol
1 H hydrogen (H_{2})
use	(H_{2}) 0.1
CRC	(H_{2}) 0.12
LNG	(H_{2}) 0.117
WEL	(per mol H atoms) 0.0585
2 He helium
use	0.0138
LNG	0.0138
WEL	0.02
3 Li lithium
use	3.00
CRC	3.00
LNG	3.00
WEL	3.0
4 Be beryllium
use	7.895
CRC	7.895
LNG	7.895
WEL	7.95
5 B boron
use	50.2
CRC	50.2
LNG	50.2
WEL	50
6 C carbon (graphite)
use	(graphite) 117
CRC	(graphite) 117
LNG	(graphite) 117
7 N nitrogen (N_{2})
use	(N_{2}) 0.720
CRC	(N_{2}) 0.71
LNG	(N_{2}) 0.720
WEL	(per mol N atoms) 0.36
8 O oxygen (O_{2})
use	(O_{2}) 0.444
CRC	(O_{2}) 0.44
LNG	(O_{2}) 0.444
WEL	(per mol O atoms) 0.222
9 F fluorine (F_{2})
use	(F_{2}) 0.510
CRC	(F_{2}) 0.51
LNG	(F_{2}) 0.510
WEL	(per mol F atoms) 0.26
10 Ne neon
use	0.335
CRC	0.328
LNG	0.335
WEL	0.34
11 Na sodium
use	2.60
CRC	2.60
LNG	2.60
WEL	2.60
12 Mg magnesium
use	8.48
CRC	8.48
LNG	8.48
WEL	8.7
13 Al aluminium
use	10.71
CRC	10.789
LNG	10.71
WEL	10.7
14 Si silicon
use	50.21
CRC	50.21
LNG	50.21
WEL	50.2
15 P phosphorus
use	0.66
CRC	(white) 0.66
LNG	0.66
WEL	0.64
16 S sulfur
use	(mono) 1.727
CRC	(mono) 1.72
LNG	(mono) 1.727
WEL	1.73
17 Cl chlorine (Cl_{2})
use	(Cl_{2}) 6.406
CRC	(Cl_{2}) 6.40
LNG	(Cl_{2}) 6.406
WEL	(per mol Cl atoms) 3.2
18 Ar argon
use	1.18
CRC	1.18
LNG	1.12
WEL	1.18
19 K potassium
use	2.321
CRC	2.33
LNG	2.321
WEL	2.33
20 Ca calcium
use	8.54
CRC	8.54
LNG	8.54
WEL	8.54
21 Sc scandium
use	14.1
CRC	14.1
LNG	14.1
WEL	16
22 Ti titanium
use	14.15
CRC	14.15
LNG	14.15
WEL	18.7
23 V vanadium
use	21.5
CRC	21.5
LNG	21.5
WEL	22.8
24 Cr chromium
use	21.0
CRC	21.0
LNG	21.0
WEL	20.5
25 Mn manganese
use	12.91
CRC	12.91
LNG	12.9
WEL	13.2
26 Fe iron
use	13.81
CRC	13.81
LNG	13.81
WEL	13.8
27 Co cobalt
use	16.06
CRC	16.06
LNG	16.2
WEL	16.2
28 Ni nickel
use	17.48
CRC	17.04
LNG	17.48
WEL	17.2
29 Cu copper
use	13.26
CRC	12.93
LNG	13.26
WEL	13.1
30 Zn zinc
use	7.32
CRC	7.068
LNG	7.32
WEL	7.35
31 Ga gallium
use	5.59
CRC	5.576
LNG	5.59
WEL	5.59
32 Ge germanium
use	36.94
CRC	36.94
LNG	36.94
WEL	31.8
33 As arsenic
use	(gray) 24.44
CRC	(gray) 24.44
LNG	24.44
WEL	27.7
34 Se selenium
use	(gray) 6.69
CRC	(gray) 6.69
LNG	6.69
WEL	5.4
35 Br bromine (Br_{2})
use	(Br_{2}) 10.57
CRC	(Br_{2}) 10.57
LNG	(Br_{2}) 10.57
WEL	(per mol Br atoms) 5.8
36 Kr krypton
use	1.64
CRC	1.64
LNG	1.37
WEL	1.64
37 Rb rubidium
use	2.19
CRC	2.19
LNG	2.19
WEL	2.19
38 Sr strontium
use	7.43
CRC	7.43
LNG	7.43
WEL	8
39 Y yttrium
use	11.42
CRC	11.4
LNG	11.42
WEL	11.4
40 Zr zirconium
use	14
	13.96 ± 0.36
CRC	21.00
LNG	21.00
WEL	21
41 Nb niobium
use	30
CRC	30
LNG	30
WEL	26.8
42 Mo molybdenum
use	37.48
CRC	37.48
LNG	37.48
WEL	36
43 Tc technetium
use	33.29
CRC	33.29
LNG	33.29
WEL	23
44 Ru ruthenium
use	38.59
CRC	38.59
LNG	38.59
WEL	25.7
45 Rh rhodium
use	26.59
CRC	26.59
LNG	26.59
WEL	21.7
46 Pd palladium
use	16.74
CRC	16.74
LNG	16.74
WEL	16.7
47 Ag silver
use	11.28
CRC	11.28
LNG	11.95
WEL	11.3
48 Cd cadmium
use	6.21
CRC	6.21
LNG	6.19
WEL	6.3
49 In indium
use	3.281
CRC	3.281
LNG	3.28
WEL	3.26
50 Sn tin
use	(white) 7.03
CRC	(white) 7.173
LNG	(white) 7.03
WEL	7.0
51 Sb antimony
use	19.79
CRC	19.79
LNG	19.87
WEL	19.7
52 Te tellurium
use	17.49
CRC	17.49
LNG	17.49
WEL	17.5
53 I iodine (I_{2})
use	(I_{2}) 15.52
CRC	(I_{2}) 15.52
LNG	(I_{2}) 150.66 [sic]
WEL	(per mol I atoms) 7.76
54 Xe xenon
use	2.27
CRC	2.27
LNG	1.81
WEL	2.30
55 Cs caesium
use	2.09
CRC	2.09
LNG	2.09
WEL	2.09
56 Ba barium
use	7.12
CRC	7.12
LNG	7.12
WEL	8.0
57 La lanthanum
use	6.20
CRC	6.20
LNG	6.20
WEL	6.2
58 Ce cerium
use	5.46
CRC	5.46
LNG	5.46
WEL	5.5
59 Pr praseodymium
use	6.89
CRC	6.89
LNG	6.89
WEL	6.9
60 Nd neodymium
use	7.14
CRC	7.14
LNG	7.14
WEL	7.1
61 Pm promethium
use	7.13
LNG	7.13
WEL	about 7.7
62 Sm samarium
use	8.62
CRC	8.62
LNG	8.62
WEL	8.6
63 Eu europium
use	9.21
CRC	9.21
LNG	9.21
WEL	9.2
64 Gd gadolinium
use	10.05
CRC	10.0
LNG	10.05
WEL	10.0
65 Tb terbium
use	10.15
CRC	10.15
LNG	10.15
WEL	10.8
66 Dy dysprosium
use	11.06
CRC	11.06
LNG	11.06
WEL	11.1
67 Ho holmium
use	17.0
CRC	17.0
LNG	16.8
WEL	17.0
68 Er erbium
use	19.90
CRC	19.9
LNG	19.90
WEL	19.9
69 Tm thulium
use	16.84
CRC	16.84
LNG	16.84
WEL	16.8
70 Yb ytterbium
use	7.66
CRC	7.66
LNG	7.66
WEL	7.7
71 Lu lutetium
use	ca. 22
CRC	22
LNG	(22)
WEL	about 22
72 Hf hafnium
use	27.2
CRC	27.2
LNG	27.2
WEL	25.5
73 Ta tantalum
use	36.57
CRC	36.57
LNG	36.57
WEL	36
74 W tungsten
use	52.31
CRC	52.31
LNG	52.31
WEL	35
75 Re rhenium
use	60.43
CRC	60.43
LNG	60.43
WEL	33
76 Os osmium
use	57.85
CRC	57.85
LNG	57.85
WEL	31
77 Ir iridium
use	41.12
CRC	41.12
LNG	41.12
WEL	26
78 Pt platinum
use	22.17
CRC	22.17
LNG	22.17
WEL	20
79 Au gold
use	12.55
CRC	12.72
LNG	12.55
WEL	12.5
80 Hg mercury
use	2.29
CRC	2.29
LNG	2.29
WEL	2.29
81 Tl thallium
use	4.14
CRC	4.14
LNG	4.14
WEL	4.2
82 Pb lead
use	4.77
CRC	4.782
LNG	4.77
WEL	4.77
83 Bi bismuth
use	11.30
CRC	11.145
LNG	11.30
WEL	10.9
84 Po polonium
use	ca. 13
WEL	about 13
85 At astatine
use	
WEL	(per mol At atoms) about 6
86 Rn radon
use	3.247
LNG	3.247
WEL	3
87 Fr francium
use	ca. 2
WEL	about 2
88 Ra radium
use	8.5
LNG	8.5
WEL	about 8
89 Ac actinium
use	14
WEL	14
90 Th thorium
use	13.81
CRC	13.81
LNG	13.81
WEL	16
91 Pa protactinium
use	12.34
CRC	12.34
LNG	12.34
WEL	15
92 U uranium
use	9.14
CRC	9.14
LNG	9.14
WEL	14
93 Np neptunium
use	3.20
CRC	3.20
LNG	3.20
WEL	10
94 Pu plutonium
use	2.82
CRC	2.82
LNG	2.82
95 Am americium
use	14.39
CRC	14.39
LNG	14.39

== Notes ==
- Values refer to the enthalpy change between the liquid phase and the most stable solid phase at the melting point (normal, 101.325 kPa).
