= Speeds of sound of the elements =

The speed of sound in any chemical element in the fluid phase has one temperature-dependent value. In the solid phase, different types of sound wave may be propagated, each with its own speed: among these types of wave are longitudinal (as in fluids), transversal, and (along a surface or plate) extensional.

== Speed of sound, solid phase ==
	longitudinal, m/s	transversal, m/s	extensional, m/s	notes
3 Li lithium
use			6000	20 °C
WEL			6000	
4 Be beryllium
use	12890	8880	12870	room temperature
CRC	12890	8880	12870	
WEL			13000	
5 B boron
use			16200	20 °C
WEL			16200	
6 C carbon
use				
WEL			18350	
11 Na sodium
use			3200	20 °C
WEL			3200	
12 Mg magnesium
use	5770	3050	4940	room temperature, annealed
CRC	5770	3050	4940	annealed
WEL			4602	
13 Al aluminium
use	6420	3040	5000	room temperature, rolled
CRC	6420	3040	5000	rolled
WEL			5100	
14 Si silicon
use	8433	5843		
Cij	8433	5843		from C11=165.64 GPa, C44=79.51 GPa, ro1=2.329 g/cm3
WEL			2200	20 °C - note: probably wrong (see talk)
19 K potassium
use			2000	20 °C
WEL			2000	
20 Ca calcium
use			3810	20 °C
WEL			3810	
22 Ti titanium
use	6070	3125	5090	room temperature
CRC	6070	3125	5090	
WEL			4140	
23 V vanadium
use			4560	20 °C
WEL			4560	
24 Cr chromium
use	6608	4005	5940	20 °C
WEL			5940	
25 Mn manganese
use			5150	20 °C
WEL			5150	
26 Fe iron
use	5950	3240	5120	room temperature, electrolytic
CRC	4994	2809	4480	cast
CRC	5950	3240	5120	electrolytic
CRC	5960	3240	5200	Armco
WEL			4910	
27 Co cobalt
use			4720	20 °C
WEL			4720	
28 Ni nickel
use	6040	3000	4900	room temperature
CRC	6040	3000	4900	
WEL			4970	
29 Cu copper
use	4760	2325	3810	room temperature, annealed
CRC	4760	2325	3810	annealed
CRC	5010	2270	3750	rolled
WEL			3570	
30 Zn zinc
use	4210	2440	3850	room temperature, rolled
CRC	4210	2440	3850	rolled
WEL			3700	
31 Ga gallium
use			2740	20 °C
WEL			2740	
32 Ge germanium
use			5400	20 °C
WEL			5400	
34 Se selenium
use			3350	20 °C
WEL			3350	
37 Rb rubidium
use			1300	20 °C
WEL			1300	
39 Y yttrium
use			3300	20 °C
WEL			3300	
40 Zr zirconium
use			3800	20 °C
WEL			3800	
41 Nb niobium
use			3480	20 °C
WEL			3480	
42 Mo molybdenum
use	6250	3350	5400	room temperature
CRC	6250	3350	5400	
WEL			6190	
44 Ru ruthenium
use			5970	20 °C
WEL			5970	
45 Rh rhodium
use			4700	20 °C
WEL			4700	
46 Pd palladium
use			3070	20 °C
WEL			3070	
47 Ag silver
use	3650	1610	2680	room temperature
CRC	3650	1610	2680	
WEL			2600	
48 Cd cadmium
use			2310	20 °C
WEL			2310	
49 In indium
use			1215	20 °C
WEL			1215	
50 Sn tin
use	3320	1670	2730	room temperature, rolled
CRC	3320	1670	2730	rolled
WEL			2500	
51 Sb antimony
use			3420	20 °C
WEL			3420	
52 Te tellurium
use			2610	20 °C
WEL			2610	
56 Ba barium
use			1620	20 °C
WEL			1620	
57 La lanthanum
use			2475	20 °C
WEL			2475	
58 Ce cerium
use			2100	20 °C
WEL			2100	
59 Pr praseodymium
use			2280	20 °C
WEL			2280	
60 Nd neodymium
use			2330	20 °C
WEL			2330	
62 Sm samarium
use			2130	20 °C
WEL			2130	
64 Gd gadolinium
use			2680	20 °C
WEL			2680	
65 Tb terbium
use			2620	20 °C
WEL			2620	
66 Dy dysprosium
use			2710	20 °C
WEL			2710	
67 Ho holmium
use			2760	20 °C
WEL			2760	
68 Er erbium
use			2830	20 °C
WEL			2830	
70 Yb ytterbium
use			1590	20 °C
WEL			1590	
72 Hf hafnium
use			3010	20 °C
WEL			3010	
73 Ta tantalum
use			3400	20 °C
WEL			3400	
74 W tungsten
use	5220	2890	4620	room temperature, annealed
CRC	5220	2890	4620	annealed
CRC	5410	2640	4320	drawn
WEL			5174	
75 Re rhenium
use			4700	20 °C
WEL			4700	
76 Os osmium
use			4940	20 °C
WEL			4940	
77 Ir iridium
use			4825	20 °C
WEL			4825	
78 Pt platinum
use	3830	1680	2800	room temperature. Calculated using Wikipedia reported values for density (21450 kg/m^{3}), Young's Modulus (167 GPa), and Poisson's ratio (0.38)
CRC	3260	1730	2800	CRC cites American Institute of Physics Handbook (AIPH) table 3f-2 for this value, but in AIPH table 2f-6 there are elastic constants reported that yield 3700,1570, 2620
WEL			2680	
AIPH	3700	1570	2620	Table 2f-6. Calculated from Young's modulus of 147 GPa (lower than commonly accepted for Platinum), Poisson's ratio of 0.39, density of 21370 kg/m^{3}
79 Au gold
use	3240	1200	2030	room temperature, hard-drawn
CRC	3240	1200	2030	hard-drawn
WEL			1740	
81 Tl thallium
use			818	20 °C
WEL			818	
82 Pb lead
use	2160	700	1190	room temperature, annealed
CRC	2160	700	1190	annealed
CRC	1960	690	1210	rolled
WEL			1260	
83 Bi bismuth
use			1790	20 °C
WEL			1790	
90 Th thorium
use			2490	20 °C
WEL			2490	
92 U uranium
use			3155	20 °C
WEL			3155	
94 Pu plutonium
use			2260	20 °C
WEL			2260	

== Speed of sound, fluid phases ==
	m/s	notes
1 H hydrogen (gas)
use	1310	27 °C
CRC	1310	27 °C
WEL	1270	
Zuckerwar	1270	20 °C, 1 atm
CRC	890	deuterium, 0 °C
1 H hydrogen (liquid)
use	1101	−252.9 °C
CRC	1101	−252.9 °C
2 He helium (gas)
use	965	0 °C
CRC	965	0 °C
Zuckerwar	1007	20 °C, 1 atm
WEL	970	
2 He helium (liquid)
use	180	−268.9 °C
CRC	180	−268.9 °C
7 N nitrogen (gas)
use	353	27 °C
CRC	353	27 °C
Zuckerwar	349	20 °C, 1 atm
WEL	333.6	
7 N nitrogen (liquid)
use	939	−195.8 °C
CRC	939	−195.8 °C
8 O oxygen (gas)
use	330	27 °C
CRC	330	27 °C
Zuckerwar	326	20 °C, 1 atm
WEL	317.5	
8 O oxygen (liquid)
use	906	−183.0 °C
CRC	906	−183.0 °C
10 Ne neon (gas)
use	435	0 °C
CRC	435	0 °C
WEL	936 (presumably for liquid?)	
17 Cl chlorine (gas)
use	206	0 °C
CRC	206	0 °C
WEL	206	
18 Ar argon (gas)
use	323	27 °C
CRC	323	27 °C
Zuckerwar	319	20 °C, 1 atm
WEL	319	
18 Ar argon (liquid)
use	813	−185.9 °C
CRC	813	−185.9 °C
36 Kr krypton (gas)
use	221	20 °C
Zuckerwar	221	20 °C, 1 atm
talk	220 ± 1, prelim. experimental value	23 °C, 101.3 kPa
36 Kr krypton (liquid)
use	1120	
88RAB	1120	
WEL	1120	
54 Xe xenon (gas)
use	178	20 °C, 1 atm
Zuckerwar	178	20 °C, 1 atm
54 Xe xenon (liquid)
use	1090	
88RAB	1090	
WEL	1090	
80 Hg mercury (liquid)
use	1451.4	20 °C
CR2	1460.8	0 °C
CR2	1451.4	20 °C
CRC	1450	25 °C
WEL	1407	

== Notes ==
- Ref. CRC: Values are "at room temperature" unless noted, and "for normal atmospheric pressure" ("at 1 atm" for gases).
- Ref. WEL: Values refer to 293 K (20 °C; 68 °F) "where possible". Midpoint values are substituted if ranges were given in their original reference. Not specified further, it is assumed from the values that all (except fluids) are for the speed of sound in a thin rod.

== Sources ==
=== WEL ===
As quoted at http://www.webelements.com/ from this source:

- G.V. Samsonov (Ed.) in Handbook of the physicochemical properties of the elements, IFI-Plenum, New York, USA, 1968.

=== CRC ===
As quoted from various sources in an online version of:

- David R. Lide (ed), CRC Handbook of Chemistry and Physics, 84th Edition. CRC Press. Boca Raton, Florida, 2003; Section 14, Geophysics, Astronomy, and Acoustics; Speed of Sound in Various Media

=== CR2 ===
As quoted from this source in an online version of: David R. Lide (ed), CRC Handbook of Chemistry and Physics, 84th Edition. CRC Press. Boca Raton, Florida, 2003; Section 6, Fluid Properties; Thermal Properties of Mercury

- Vukalovich, M. P., et al., Thermophysical Properties of Mercury, Moscow Standard Press, 1971.

=== APIH ===
Dwight E. Gray (ed), American Institute of Physics Handbook. McGraw-Hill. Boca Raton, Florida, New York, 1957.

=== Other ===
- 88RAB: V.A. Rabinovich, et al. Thermophysical Properties of Neon, Argon, Krypton and Xenon. Selover (Eng. ed.) Hemisphere, Washington DC, 1988.
- Zuckerwar: A. J. Zuckerwar, Handbook of the Speed of Sound in Real Gases. Academic Press, 2002.
