= Heats of vaporization of the elements (data page) =

Chemical data page

== Heat of vaporization ==
| | kJ/mol |
1 H hydrogen (H_{2})
| use | (H_{2}) 0.904 |
| CRC | (H_{2}) 0.90 |
| LNG | 0.904 |
2 He helium
| use | 0.0829 |
| CRC | 0.08 |
| LNG | 0.0829 |
| WEL | 0.083 |
3 Li lithium
| use | 136 |
| LNG | 147.1 |
| WEL | 147 |
| Zhang et al. | 136 |
4 Be beryllium
| use | 292 |
| LNG | 297 |
| WEL | 297 |
| Zhang et al. | 292 |
5 B boron
| use | 508 |
| CRC | 480 |
| LNG | 480 |
| WEL | 507 |
| Zhang et al. | 508 |
6 C carbon
| use | |
| WEL | (sublimation) 715 |
7 N nitrogen (N_{2})
| use | (N_{2}) 5.57 |
| CRC | (N_{2}) 5.57 |
| LNG | (N_{2}) 5.577 |
| WEL | (per mole N atoms) 2.79 |
| Zhang et al. | 5.58 |
8 O oxygen (O_{2})
| use | (O_{2}) 6.82 |
| CRC | (O_{2}) 6.82 |
| LNG | (O_{2}) 6.820 |
| WEL | (per mole O atoms) 3.41 |
| Zhang et al. | 6.82 |
9 F fluorine (F_{2})
| use | (F_{2}) 6.62 |
| CRC | (F_{2}) 6.62 |
| LNG | (F_{2}) 6.62 |
| WEL | (per mole F atoms) 3.27 |
| Zhang et al. | 6.32 |
10 Ne neon
| use | 1.71 |
| CRC | 1.71 |
| LNG | 1.71 |
| WEL | 1.75 |
| Zhang et al. | 1.9 |
11 Na sodium
| use | 97.42 |
| LNG | 97.42 |
| WEL | 97.7 |
| Zhang et al. | 97.4 |
12 Mg magnesium
| use | 128 |
| LNG | 128 |
| WEL | 128 |
| Zhang et al. | 132 |
13 Al aluminium
| use | 284 |
| CRC | 294 |
| LNG | 294.0 |
| WEL | 293 |
| Zhang et al. | 284 |
14 Si silicon
| use | 359 |
| LNG | 359 |
| WEL | 359 |
| Zhang et al. | 383 |
15 P phosphorus
| use | 12.4 |
| CRC | 12.4 |
| LNG | 12.4 |
| WEL | 12.4 |
| Zhang et al. | 51.9 (white) |
16 S sulfur
| use | (mono) 45 |
| CRC | 45 |
| LNG | (mono) 45 |
| WEL | 9.8 |
| Zhang et al. | 45 |
17 Cl chlorine (Cl_{2})
| use | (Cl_{2}) 20.41 |
| CRC | (Cl_{2}) 20.41 |
| LNG | (Cl_{2}) 20.41 |
| WEL | (per mole Cl atoms) 10.2 |
| Zhang et al. | 20.4 |
18 Ar argon
| use | 6.53 |
| CRC | 6.43 |
| LNG | 6.43 |
| WEL | 6.5 |
| Zhang et al. | 6.53 |
19 K potassium
| use | 76.90 |
| LNG | 76.90 |
| WEL | 76.9 |
| Zhang et al. | 79.1 |
20 Ca calcium
| use | 154.7 |
| LNG | 154.7 |
| WEL | 155 |
| Zhang et al. | 153 |
21 Sc scandium
| use | 332.7 |
| LNG | 332.7 |
| WEL | 318 |
| Zhang et al. | 310 |
22 Ti titanium
| use | 425 |
| LNG | 425 |
| WEL | 425 |
| Zhang et al. | 427 |
23 V vanadium
| use | 444 |
| LNG | 459 |
| WEL | 453 |
| Zhang et al. | 451 |
24 Cr chromium
| use | 339.5 |
| LNG | 339.5 |
| WEL | 339 |
| Zhang et al. | 347 |
25 Mn manganese
| use | 221 |
| LNG | 221 |
| WEL | 220 |
| Zhang et al. | 225 |
26 Fe iron
| use | 340 |
| LNG | 340 |
| WEL | 347 |
| Zhang et al. | 354 |
27 Co cobalt
| use | 377 |
| LNG | 377 |
| WEL | 375 |
| Zhang et al. | 390 |
28 Ni nickel
| use | 379 |
| LNG | 377.5 |
| WEL | 378 |
| Zhang et al. | 379 |
29 Cu copper
| use | 300.4 |
| LNG | 300.4 |
| WEL | 300 |
| Zhang et al. | 305 |
30 Zn zinc
| use | 115 |
| LNG | 123.6 |
| WEL | 119 |
| Zhang et al. | 115 |
31 Ga gallium
| use | 256 |
| CRC | 254 |
| LNG | 254 |
| WEL | 256 |
| Zhang et al. | 256 |
32 Ge germanium
| use | 334 |
| CRC | 334 |
| LNG | 334 |
| WEL | 334 |
| Zhang et al. | 330 |
33 As arsenic
| use | 32.4 |
| WEL | 32.4 (sublimation) |
| Zhang et al. | 32.4 |
34 Se selenium
| use | 95.48 |
| CRC | 95.48 |
| LNG | 95.48 |
| WEL | 26 |
| Zhang et al. | 95.5 |
35 Br bromine (Br_{2})
| use | (Br_{2}) 29.96 |
| CRC | (Br_{2}) 29.96 |
| LNG | (Br_{2}) 29.96 |
| WEL | (per mole Br atoms) 14.8 |
| Zhang et al. | 30 |
36 Kr krypton
| use | 9.08 |
| CRC | 9.08 |
| LNG | 9.08 |
| WEL | 9.02 |
| Zhang et al. | 9.03 |
37 Rb rubidium
| use | 75.77 |
| LNG | 75.77 |
| WEL | 72 |
| Zhang et al. | 69 |
38 Sr strontium
| use | 141 |
| LNG | 136.9 |
| WEL | 137 |
| Zhang et al. | 141 |
39 Y yttrium
| use | 390 |
| LNG | 365 |
| WEL | 380 |
| Zhang et al. | 363 |
40 Zr zirconium
| use | 573 |
| LNG | 573 |
| WEL | 580 |
| Zhang et al. | 591 |
41 Nb niobium
| use | 689.9 |
| LNG | 689.9 |
| WEL | 690 |
| Zhang et al. | 682 |
42 Mo molybdenum
| use | 617 |
| LNG | 617 |
| WEL | 600 |
| Zhang et al. | 617 |
43 Tc technetium
| use | 585.2 |
| LNG | 585.2 |
| WEL | 550 |
44 Ru ruthenium
| use | 619 |
| LNG | 591.6 |
| WEL | 580 |
| Zhang et al. | 619 |
45 Rh rhodium
| use | 494 |
| LNG | 494 |
| WEL | 495 |
| Zhang et al. | 493 |
46 Pd palladium
| use | 358 |
| LNG | 362 |
| WEL | 380 |
| Zhang et al. | 358 |
47 Ag silver
| use | 254 |
| LNG | 258 |
| WEL | 255 |
| Zhang et al. | 254 |
48 Cd cadmium
| use | 99.87 |
| CRC | 99.87 |
| LNG | 99.9 |
| WEL | 100 |
| Zhang et al. | 100 |
49 In indium
| use | 231.8 |
| LNG | 231.8 |
| WEL | 230 |
| Zhang et al. | 225 |
50 Sn tin
| use | (white) 296.1 |
| LNG | (white) 296.1 |
| WEL | 290 |
| Zhang et al. | 296 |
51 Sb antimony
| use | 193.43 |
| LNG | 193.43 |
| WEL | 68 |
| Zhang et al. | 193 |
52 Te tellurium
| use | 114.1 |
| CRC | 114.1 |
| LNG | 114.1 |
| WEL | 48 |
| Zhang et al. | 114 |
53 I iodine (I_{2})
| use | (I_{2}) 41.57 |
| CRC | (I_{2}) 41.57 |
| LNG | (I_{2}) 41.6 |
| WEL | (per mole I atoms) 20.9 |
| Zhang et al. | 41.6 |
54 Xe xenon
| use | 12.64 |
| CRC | 12.57 |
| LNG | 12.64 |
| WEL | 12.64 |
| Zhang et al. | 12.6 |
55 Cs caesium
| use | 63.9 |
| LNG | 63.9 |
| WEL | 65 |
| Zhang et al. | 66.1 |
56 Ba barium
| use | 140.3 |
| CRC | 140 |
| LNG | 140.3 |
| WEL | 140 |
| Zhang et al. | 142 |
57 La lanthanum
| use | 400 |
| LNG | 402.1 |
| WEL | 400 |
| Zhang et al. | 400 |
58 Ce cerium
| use | 398 |
| LNG | 398 |
| WEL | 350 |
| Zhang et al. | 398 |
59 Pr praseodymium
| use | 331 |
| LNG | 331 |
| WEL | 330 |
| Zhang et al. | 331 |
60 Nd neodymium
| use | 289 |
| LNG | 289 |
| WEL | 285 |
| Zhang et al. | 289 |
61 Pm promethium
| use | 289 |
| LNG | 289 |
| WEL | 290 |
62 Sm samarium
| use | 192 |
| LNG | 165 |
| WEL | 175 |
| Zhang et al. | 192 |
63 Eu europium
| use | 176 |
| LNG | 176 |
| WEL | 175 |
| Zhang et al. | 176 |
64 Gd gadolinium
| use | 301.3 |
| LNG | 301.3 |
| WEL | 305 |
| Zhang et al. | 301 |
65 Tb terbium
| use | 391 |
| LNG | 293 |
| WEL | 295 |
| Zhang et al. | 391 |
66 Dy dysprosium
| use | 280 |
| LNG | 280 |
| WEL | 280 |
| Zhang et al. | 280 |
67 Ho holmium
| use | 251 |
| LNG | 71 |
| WEL | 265 |
| Zhang et al. | 251 |
68 Er erbium
| use | 280 |
| LNG | 280 |
| WEL | 285 |
| Zhang et al. | 280 |
69 Tm thulium
| use | 191 |
| LNG | 247 |
| WEL | 250 |
| Zhang et al. | 191 |
70 Yb ytterbium
| use | 129 |
| LNG | 159 |
| WEL | 160 |
| Zhang et al. | 129 |
71 Lu lutetium
| use | 414 |
| LNG | 414 |
| WEL | 415 |
| Zhang et al. | 414 |
72 Hf hafnium
| use | 648 |
| LNG | 571 |
| WEL | 630 |
| Zhang et al. | 648 |
73 Ta tantalum
| use | 732.8 |
| LNG | 732.8 |
| WEL | 735 |
| Zhang et al. | 753 |
74 W tungsten
| use | 806.7 |
| LNG | 806.7 |
| WEL | 800 |
| Zhang et al. | 774 |
75 Re rhenium
| use | 704 |
| LNG | 704 |
| WEL | 705 |
| Zhang et al. | 707 |
76 Os osmium
| use | 678 |
| LNG | 738 |
| WEL | 630 |
| Zhang et al. | 678 |
77 Ir iridium
| use | 564 |
| LNG | 231.8 |
| WEL | 560 |
| Zhang et al. | 564 |
78 Pt platinum
| use | 510 |
| LNG | 469 |
| WEL | 490 |
| Zhang et al. | 510 |
79 Au gold
| use | 342 |
| CRC | 324 |
| LNG | 324 |
| WEL | 330 |
| Zhang et al. | 342 |
80 Hg mercury
| use | 59.11 |
| CRC | 59.11 |
| LNG | 59.1 |
| WEL | 59.2 |
| Zhang et al. | 58.2 |
81 Tl thallium
| use | 165 |
| LNG | 165 |
| WEL | 165 |
| Zhang et al. | 162 |
82 Pb lead
| use | 179.5 |
| CRC | 179.5 |
| LNG | 179.5 |
| WEL | 178 |
| Zhang et al. | 177 |
83 Bi bismuth
| use | 179 |
| CRC | 151 |
| LNG | 151 |
| WEL | 160 |
| Zhang et al. | 179 |
84 Po polonium
| use | 102.91 |
| LNG | 102.91 |
| WEL | about 100 |
85 At astatine
| use | 54.39 (At_{2}) |
| GME | 54.39 (At_{2}) |
| WEL | about 40 |
86 Rn radon
| use | 18.10 |
| LNG | 18.10 |
| WEL | 17 |
87 Fr francium
| use | ca. 65 |
| WEL | about 65 |
88 Ra radium
| use | 113 |
| LNG | 113 |
| WEL | about 125 |
89 Ac actinium
| use | 400 |
| WEL | 400 |
90 Th thorium
| use | 514 |
| LNG | 514 |
| WEL | 530 |
91 Pa protactinium
| use | 481 |
| LNG | 481 |
| WEL | 470 |
92 U uranium
| use | 417.1 |
| LNG | 417.1 |
| WEL | 420 |
93 Np neptunium
| use | 336 |
| LNG | 336 |
| WEL | 335 |
94 Pu plutonium
| use | 333.5 |
| LNG | 333.5 |
| WEL | 325 |

== Notes ==
- Values refer to the enthalpy change in the conversion of liquid to gas at the boiling point (normal, 101.325 kPa).
