= Vapor pressures of the elements =

Chemical data page

== Vapor pressure ==
P/(Pa)	1	10	100	200	1 k	2 k	5 k	10 k	20 k	50 k	100 k	101325
reference	1	10	100	200	1 k	2 k	5 k	10 k	20 k	50 k	100 k	101325
1 H hydrogen
use (T/K)								15			20	
CRC.a (T/°C)								-258.6			-252.8	
KAL (T/K)				10 (s)	11.4 (s)	12.2 (s)	13.4 (s)	14.5	16.0	18.2		20.3
2 He helium
use (T/K)								3			4	
CRC.b (T/°C)								-270.6			-268.9	
KAL (T/K)				1.3	1.66	1.85	2.17	2.48	2.87	3.54		4.22
3 Li lithium
use (T/K)	797	885	995		1144			1337			1610	
CRC.f,k (T/°C)	524.3	612.3	722.1		871.2			1064.3			1337.1	
CR2	solid, 298 K to m.p.: log (P/Pa) = 10.673 - 8310 / (T/K)											
CR2 (T/K)	liquid, m.p. to 1000 K: log (P/Pa) = 10.061 - 8023 / (T/K)											
CR2 (T/K)	797.4	885.4	995.3									
KAL (T/K)				1040	1145	1200	1275	1345	1415	1530		1630
SMI.a (T/K)	liquid, 325..725 °C: log (P/Pa) = 9.625 - 7480 / (T/K)											
SMI.a (T/K)	777	867	981									
4 Be beryllium
use (T/K)	1462	1608	1791		2023			2327			2742	
CRC.b (T/°C)	1189 (s)	1335	1518		1750			2054			2469	
CR2 (T/K)	solid, 298 K to m.p.: log (P/Pa) = 13.048 - 17020 / (T/K) - 0.4440 log (T/K)											
CR2 (T/K)	1461.8											
CR2 (T/K)	liquid, m.p. to 1800 K: log (P/Pa) = 10.792 - 15731 / (T/K)											
CR2 (T/K)		1606.5	1789.2									
SMI.c,g (T/K)	solid, 942..1284 °C: log (P/Pa) = 12.115 - 18220 / (T/K)											
SMI.c,g (T/K)	1504											
SMI.c,g (T/K)	liquid, 1284..1582 °C: log (P/Pa) = 11.075 - 16590 / (T/K)											
SMI.c,g (T/K)		1647	1828									
5 B boron
use (T/K)	2348	2562	2822		3141			3545			4072	
CRC.b (T/°C)	2075	2289	2549		2868			3272			3799	
SMI.c (T/K)	solid, 1052..1648 °C: log (P/Pa) = 13.255 - 21370 / (T/K)											
SMI.c (T/K)	1612	1744	1899									
6 C carbon (graphite)
use (T/K)		2839	3048		3289			3572			3908	
CRC.h (T/°C)		2566 (s)	2775 (s)		3016 (s)			3299 (s)			3635 (s)	
7 N nitrogen
use (T/K)	37	41	46		53			62			77	
CRC.a,d (T/°C)	-236 (s)	-232 (s)	-226.8 (s)		-220.2 (s)			-211.1 (s)			-195.9	
KAL (T/K)				48.1 (s)	53.0 (s)	55.4 (s)	59.0 (s)	62.1 (s)	65.8	71.8		77.4
8 O oxygen
use (T/K)					61			73			90	
CRC.a,i (T/°C)					-211.9			-200.5			-183.1	
KAL (T/K)				55.4	61.3	64.3	68.8	72.7	77.1	83.9		90.2
9 F fluorine
use (T/K)	38	44	50		58			69			85	
CRC.a,d (T/°C)	-235 (s)	-229.5 (s)	-222.9 (s)		-214.8			-204.3			-188.3	
KAL (T/K)				53	58	61	65.3	68.9	73.0	79.3		85.0
10 Ne neon
use (T/K)	12	13	15		18			21			27	
CRC.b (T/°C)	-261 (s)	-260 (s)	-258 (s)		-255 (s)			-252 (s)			-246.1	
KAL (T/K)				16.3 (s)	18.1 (s)	19.0 (s)	20.4 (s)	21.6 (s)	22.9 (s)	24.9		27.1
11 Na sodium
use (T/K)	554	617	697		802			946			1153	
CRC.f,k (T/°C)	280.6	344.2	424.3		529			673			880.2	
CR2	solid, 298 K to m.p.: log (P/Pa) = 10.304 - 5603 / (T/K)											
CR2 (T/K)	liquid, m.p. to 700 K: log (P/Pa) = 9.710 - 5377 / (T/K)											
CR2 (T/K)	553.8	617.3	697.4									
KAL (T/K)				729	807	846	904	954	1010	1095		1175
SMI.a (T/K)	liquid, 158..437 °C: log (P/Pa) = 9.835 - 5480 / (T/K)											
SMI.a (T/K)	557	620	699									
12 Mg magnesium
use (T/K)	701	773	861		971			1132			1361	
CRC.b (T/°C)	428 (s)	500 (s)	588 (s)		698			859			1088	
CR2 (T/K)	solid, 298 K to m.p.: log (P/Pa) = 13.495 - 7813 / (T/K) - 0.8253 log (T/K)											
CR2 (T/K)	700.9	772.7	861.2	892.0								
KAL (T/K)				891	979	1025	1085	1140	1205	1295		1375
SMI.a (T/K)	solid, 287..605 °C: log (P/Pa) = 10.945 - 7741 / (T/K)											
SMI.a (T/K)	707	778	865									
13 Al aluminium
use (T/K)	1482	1632	1817		2054			2364			2790	
CRC.b (T/°C)	1209	1359	1544		1781			2091			2517	
CR2	solid, 298 K to m.p.: log (P/Pa) = 14.465 - 17342 / (T/K) - 0.7927 log (T/K)											
CR2 (T/K)	liquid, m.p. to 1800 K: log (P/Pa) = 10.917 - 16211 / (T/K)											
CR2 (T/K)	1484.9	1634.7	1818.0									
KAL (T/K)				1885	2060	2140	2260	2360	2430	2640		2790
SMI.c,l (T/K)	liquid, 843..1465 °C: log (P/Pa) = 11.115 - 15630 / (T/K)											
SMI.c,l (T/K)	1406	1545										
14 Si silicon
use (T/K)	1908	2102	2339		2636			3021			3537	
CRC.b (T/°C)	1635	1829	2066		2363			2748			3264	
KAL (T/K)				2380	2590	2690	2840	2970	3100	3310		3490
SMI.c (T/K)	solid, 1024..1410 °C: log (P/Pa) = 12.325 - 19720 / (T/K)											
SMI.c (T/K)	1600											
SMI.c (T/K)	liquid, 1410..1670 °C: log (P/Pa) = 11.675 - 18550 / (T/K)											
SMI.c (T/K)		1738	1917									
15 P phosphorus (white)
use (T/K)	279	307	342		388			453			549	
CRC.c,e (T/°C)	6 (s)	34 (s)	69		115			180			276	
KAL (T/K)				365	398	414	439	460	484	520.5		553.6
15 P phosphorus (red)
use (T/K)	455	489	529		576			635			704	
CRC.b,c (T/°C)	182 (s)	216 (s)	256 (s)		303 (s)			362 (s)			431 (s)	
16 S sulfur
use (T/K)	375	408	449		508			591			717	
CRC.c (T/°C)	102 (s)	135	176		235			318			444	
KAL (T/K)				462	505.7	528.0	561.3	590.1	622.5	672.4		717.8
17 Cl chlorine
use (T/K)	128	139	153		170			197			239	
CRC.a (T/°C)	-145 (s)	-133.7 (s)	-120.2 (s)		-103.6 (s)			-76.1			-34.2	
KAL (T/K)				158 (s)	170 (s)	176.3	187.4	197.0	207.8	224.3		239.2
18 Ar argon
use (T/K)		47	53		61			71			87	
CRC.a,d,l (T/°C)		-226.4 (s)	-220.3 (s)		-212.4 (s)			-201.7 (s)			-186.0	
KAL (T/K)				55.0 (s)	60.7 (s)	63.6 (s)	67.8 (s)	71.4 (s)	75.4 (s)	81.4 (s)		87.3
19 K potassium
use (T/K)	473	530	601		697			832			1029	
CRC.f,k (T/°C)	200.2	256.5	328		424			559			756.2	
CR2	solid, 298 K to m.p.: log (P/Pa) = 9.967 - 4646 / (T/K)											
CR2 (T/K)	liquid, m.p. to 600 K: log (P/Pa) = 9.408 - 4453 / (T/K)											
CR2 (T/K)	473.3	529.6	601.1									
KAL (T/K)				633	704	740	794	841	894	975		1050
SMI.a (T/K)	liquid, 91..338 °C: log (P/Pa) = 9.485 - 4503 / (T/K)											
SMI.a (T/K)	475	531	602									
20 Ca calcium
use (T/K)	864	956	1071		1227			1443			1755	
CRC.b (T/°C)	591 (s)	683 (s)	798 (s)		954			1170			1482	
CR2 (T/K)	solid, 298 K to m.p.: log (P/Pa) = 15.133 - 9517 / (T/K) - 1.4030 log (T/K)											
CR2 (T/K)	864.2	956.4	1071.5	1112.0								
KAL (T/K)				1105	1220	1280	1365	1440	1525	1650		1765
SMI.a (T/K)	408..817 °C: log (P/Pa) = 10.425 - 9055 / (T/K)											
SMI.a (T/K)	869	961	1075									
21 Sc scandium
use (T/K)	1645	1804	(2006)		(2266)			(2613)			(3101)	
CRC.c (T/°C)	1372 (s)	1531 (s)	1733 (i)		1993 (i)			2340 (i)			2828 (i)	
CR2	solid, 298 K to m.p.: log (P/Pa) = 11.656 - 19721 / (T/K) + 0.2885 log (T/K) - 0.3663 (T/K) 10^{−3}											
CR2	liquid, m.p. to 2000 K: log (P/Pa) = 10.801 - 17681 / (T/K)											
SMI.c (T/K)	1058..1804 °C: log (P/Pa) = 11.065 - 18570 / (T/K)											
SMI.c (T/K)	1678	1845	2049									
22 Ti titanium
use (T/K)	1982	2171	(2403)		2692			3064			3558	
CRC.b (T/°C)	1709	1898	2130 (e)		2419			2791			3285	
CR2	solid, 298 K to m.p.: log (P/Pa) = 16.931 - 24991 / (T/K) - 1.3376 log (T/K)											
CR2 (T/K)	liquid, m.p. to 2400 K: log (P/Pa) = 11.364 - 22747 / (T/K)											
CR2 (T/K)	2001.7	2194.8										
SMI.c (T/K)	solid, 1134..1727 °C: log (P/Pa) = 10.375 - 18640 / (T/K)											
SMI.c (T/K)	1797	1988										
SMI.c (T/K)	liquid, 1727..1965 °C: log (P/Pa) = 11.105 - 20110 / (T/K)											
SMI.c (T/K)			2209									
23 V vanadium
use (T/K)	2101	2289	2523		2814			3187			3679	
CRC.b (T/°C)	1828 (s)	2016	2250		2541			2914			3406	
CR2 (T/K)	solid, 298 K to m.p.: log (P/Pa) = 14.750 - 27132 / (T/K) - 0.5501 log (T/K)											
CR2 (T/K)	2099.6											
CR2 (T/K)	liquid, m.p. to 2500 K: log (P/Pa) = 11.935 - 25011 / (T/K)											
CR2 (T/K)		2287.2	2517.5									
SMI.c (T/K)	1465..2207 °C: log (P/Pa) = 12.445 - 26620 / (T/K)											
SMI.c (T/K)	2139	2326										
24 Cr chromium
use (T/K)	1656	1807	1991		2223			2530			2942	
CRC.b (T/°C)	1383 (s)	1534 (s)	1718 (s)		1950			2257			2669	
CR2	solid, 298 K to 2000 K: log (P/Pa) = 11.806 - 20733 / (T/K) + 0.4391 log (T/K) - 0.4094 (T/K)^{−3}											
KAL (T/K)				2020	2180	2260	2370	2470	2580	2730		2870
SMI.c,l (T/K)	solid, 907..1504 °C: log (P/Pa) = 12.005 - 17560 / (T/K)											
SMI.c,l (T/K)	1463	1596	1755									
25 Mn manganese
use (T/K)	1228	1347	1493		1691			1955			2333	
CRC.b (T/°C)	955 (s)	1074 (s)	1220 (s)		1418			1682			2060	
CR2 (T/K)	solid, 298 K to m.p.: log (P/Pa) = 17.811 - 15097 / (T/K) - 1.7896 log (T/K)											
CR2 (T/K)	1229.2	1346.6	1490.0									
KAL (T/K)				1560	1710	1780	1890	1980	2080	2240		2390
SMI.c (T/K)	717..1251 °C: log (P/Pa) = 11.375 - 14100 / (T/K)											
SMI.c (T/K)	1240	1359	1504									
26 Fe iron
use (T/K)	1728	1890	2091		2346			2679			3132	
CRC.b (T/°C)	1455 (s)	1617	1818		2073			2406			2859	
CR2	solid, 298 K to m.p.: log (P/Pa) = 12.106 - 21723 / (T/K) + 0.4536 log (T/K) - 0.5846 (T/K) 10^{−3}											
CR2 (T/K)	liquid, m.p. to 2100 K: log (P/Pa) = 11.353 - 19574 / (T/K)											
CR2 (T/K)		1890.7	2092.8									
KAL (T/K)				2110	2290	2380	2500	2610	2720	2890		3030
SMI.c,f (T/K)	solid, 1094..1535 °C: log (P/Pa) = 11.755 - 20000 / (T/K)											
SMI.c,f (T/K)	1701											
SMI.c,f (T/K)	liquid, 1535..1783 °C: log (P/Pa) = 12.535 - 21400 / (T/K)											
SMI.c,f (T/K)		1855	2031									
27 Co cobalt
use (T/K)	1790	1960	2165		2423			2755			3198	
CRC.b (T/°C)	1517	1687	1892		2150			2482			2925	
CR2	solid, 298 K to m.p.: log (P/Pa) = 15.982 - 22576 / (T/K) - 1.0280 log (T/K)											
CR2 (T/K)	liquid, m.p. to 2150 K: log (P/Pa) = 11.494 - 20578 / (T/K)											
CR2 (T/K)	1790.3	1960.9	2167.5									
SMI.c (T/K)	1249..2056 °C: log (P/Pa) = 11.555 - 21960 / (T/K)											
SMI.c (T/K)	1900	2081	2298									
28 Ni nickel
use (T/K)	1783	1950	2154		2410			2741			3184	
CRC.b (T/°C)	1510	1677	1881		2137			2468			2911	
CR2	solid, 298 K to m.p.: log (P/Pa) = 15.563 - 22606 / (T/K) - 0.8717 log (T/K)											
CR2 (T/K)	liquid, m.p. to 2150 K: log (P/Pa) = 11.672 - 20765 / (T/K)											
CR2 (T/K)	1779.0	1945.7	2146.9									
KAL (T/K)				2230	2410	2500	2630	2740	2860	3030		3180
SMI.c,q	solid, 1157..1455 °C: log (P/Pa) = 12.405 - 21840 / (T/K)											
SMI.c,q (T/K)	liquid, 1455..1884 °C: log (P/Pa) = 11.675 - 20600 / (T/K)											
SMI.c,q (T/K)	1764	1930	2129									
29 Cu copper
use (T/K)	1509	1661	1850		2089			2404			2836	
CRC.b (T/°C)	1236	1388	1577		1816			2131			2563	
CR2	solid, 298 K to m.p.: log (P/Pa) = 14.129 - 17748 / (T/K) - 0.7317 log (T/K)											
CR2 (T/K)	liquid, m.p. to 1850 K: log (P/Pa) = 10.855 - 16415 / (T/K)											
CR2 (T/K)	1512.2	1665.7	1853.8									
KAL (T/K)				1940	2110	2200	2320	2420	2540	2710		2860
SMI.c,f	solid, 946..1083 °C: log (P/Pa) = 11.935 - 18060 / (T/K)											
SMI.c,f (T/K)	liquid, 1083..1628 °C: log (P/Pa) = 10.845 - 16580 / (T/K)											
SMI.c,f (T/K)	1529	1684	1875									
30 Zn zinc
use (T/K)	610	670	750		852			990			(1185)	
CRC.b (T/°C)	337 (s)	397 (s)	477		579			717			912 (e)	
CR2 (T/K)	solid, 298 K to m.p.: log (P/Pa) = 11.108 - 6776 / (T/K)											
CR2 (T/K)	610.0	670.4										
CR2 (T/K)	liquid, m.p. to 750 K: log (P/Pa) = 10.384 - 6286 / (T/K)											
CR2 (T/K)			749.8									
KAL (T/K)				780	854	891	945	991	1040	1120		1185
SMI.a (T/K)	solid, 211..405 °C: log (P/Pa) = 11.065 - 6744 / (T/K)											
SMI.a (T/K)	609	670										
31 Ga gallium
use (T/K)	1310	1448	1620		1838			2125			2518	
CRC.b (T/°C)	1037	1175	1347		1565			1852			2245	
CR2	solid, 298 K to m.p.: log (P/Pa) = 11.663 - 14208 / (T/K)											
CR2 (T/K)	liquid, m.p. to 1600 K: log (P/Pa) = 11.760 - 13984 / (T/K) - 0.3413 log (T/K)											
CR2 (T/K)	1307.4	1444.4	1613.8									
KAL (T/K)				1665	1820	1900	2000	2100	2200	2350		2480
SMI.c (T/K)	liquid, 771..1443 °C: log (P/Pa) = 9.915 - 13360 / (T/K)											
SMI.c (T/K)	1347	1499	1688									
32 Ge germanium
use (T/K)	1644	1814	2023		2287			2633			3104	
CRC.b (T/°C)	1371	1541	1750		2014			2360			2831	
SMI.c (T/K)	897..1635 °C: log (P/Pa) = 10.065 - 15150 / (T/K)											
SMI.c (T/K)	1505	1671	1878									
33 As arsenic
use (T/K)	553	596	646		706			781			874	
CRC.c (T/°C)	280 (s)	323 (s)	373 (s)		433 (s)			508 (s)			601 (s)	
KAL (T/K)				656 (s)	701 (s)	723 (s)	754 (s)	780 (s)	808 (s)	849 (s)		883 (s)
34 Se selenium
use (T/K)	500	552	617		704			813			958	
CRC.c (T/°C)	227	279	344		431			540			685	
KAL (T/K)				636	695	724	767	803	844	904		958
35 Br bromine
use (T/K)	185	201	220		244			276			332	
CRC.a (T/°C)	-87.7 (s)	-71.8 (s)	-52.7 (s)		-29.3 (s)			2.5			58.4	
KAL (T/K)				227 (s)	244.1 (s)	252.1 (s)	263.6 (s)	275.7	290.0	312.0		332.0
36 Kr krypton
use (T/K)	59	65	74		84			99			120	
CRC.d (T/°C)	-214.0 (s)	-208.0 (s)	-199.4 (s)		-188.9 (s)			-174.6 (s)			-153.6	
KAL (T/K)				77 (s)	84.3 (s)	88.1 (s)	93.8 (s)	98.6 (s)	103.9 (s)	112.0 (s)		119.7
37 Rb rubidium
use (T/K)	434	486	552		641			769			958	
CRC.f,k (T/°C)	160.4	212.5	278.9		368			496.1			685.3	
CR2	solid, 298 K to m.p.: log (P/Pa) = 9.863 - 4215 / (T/K)											
CR2 (T/K)	liquid, m.p. to 550 K: log (P/Pa) = 9.318 - 4040 / (T/K)											
CR2 (T/K)	433.6	485.7	552.1									
KAL (T/K)				583	649	684	735	779	829	907		978
SMI.d (T/K)	liquid, 59.4..283 °C: log (P/Pa) = 9.545 - 4132 / (T/K)											
SMI.d (T/K)	433	484	548									
38 Sr strontium
use (T/K)	796	882	990		1139			1345			1646	
CRC.b (T/°C)	523 (s)	609 (s)	717 (s)		866			1072			1373	
CR2 (T/K)	solid, 298 K to m.p.: log (P/Pa) = 14.232 - 8572 / (T/K) - 1.1926 log (T/K)											
CR2 (T/K)	795.7	882.0	989.9	1028.0								
KAL (T/K)				1040 (s)	1150	1205	1285	1355	1430	1550		1660
SMI.c (T/K)	solid, 361..750 °C: log (P/Pa) = 10.255 - 8324 / (T/K)											
SMI.c (T/K)	812	899	1008									
39 Y yttrium
use (T/K)	1883	2075	(2320)		(2627)			(3036)			(3607)	
CRC.c (T/°C)	1610.1	1802.3	2047 (i)		2354 (i)			2763 (i)			3334 (i)	
CR2	solid, 298 K to m.p.: log (P/Pa) = 14.741 - 22306 / (T/K) - 0.8705 log (T/K)											
CR2 (T/K)	liquid, m.p. to 2300 K: log (P/Pa) = 10.801 - 20341 / (T/K)											
CR2 (T/K)	1883.3	2075.4										
SMI.c (T/K)	1249..2056 °C: log (P/Pa) = 11.555 - 21970 / (T/K)											
SMI.c (T/K)	1901	2081	2299									
40 Zr zirconium
use (T/K)	2639	2891	3197		3575			4053			4678	
CRC.b (T/°C)	2366	2618	2924		3302			3780			4405	
CR2	solid, 298 K to m.p.: log (P/Pa) = 15.014 - 31512 / (T/K) - 0.7890 log (T/K)											
CR2	liquid, m.p. to 2500 K: log (P/Pa) = 11.812 - 30295 / (T/K)											
SMI.c (T/K)	solid, 1527..2127 °C: log (P/Pa) = 11.505 - 25870 / (T/K)											
SMI.c (T/K)	2249											
SMI.c (T/K)	liquid, 2127..2459 °C: log (P/Pa) = 12.165 - 27430 / (T/K)											
SMI.c (T/K)		2457	2698									
41 Nb niobium
use (T/K)	2942	3207	3524		3910			4393			5013	
CRC.b (T/°C)	2669	2934	3251		3637			4120			4740	
CR2	solid, 298 K to 2500 K: log (P/Pa) = 13.828 - 37818 / (T/K) - 0.2575 log (T/K)											
SMI.n	2194..2539 °C: log (P/Pa) = 13.495 - 40400 / (T/K)											
42 Mo molybdenum
use (T/K)	2742	2994	3312		3707			4212			4879	
CRC.b (T/°C)	2469 (s)	2721	3039		3434			3939			4606	
CR2	solid, 298 K to 2500 K: log (P/Pa) = 16.535 - 34626 / (T/K) - 1.1331 log (T/K)											
KAL (T/K)				3420	3720	3860	4060	4220	4410	4680		4900
SMI.r (T/K)	solid, 1923..2533 °C: log (P/Pa) = 10.925 - 30310 / (T/K)											
SMI.r (T/K)	2774											
43 Tc technetium
use (T/K)	(2727)	(2998)	(3324)		(3726)			(4234)			(4894)	
CRC.b (T/°C)	2454 (e)	2725 (e)	3051 (e)		3453 (e)			3961 (e)			4621 (e)	
44 Ru ruthenium
use (T/K)	2588	2811	3087		3424			3845			4388	
CRC.b (T/°C)	2315 (s)	2538	2814		3151			3572			4115	
CR2 (T/K)	solid, 298 K to m.p.: log (P/Pa) = 14.761 - 34154 / (T/K) - 0.4723 log (T/K)											
CR2 (T/K)	2597.6											
SMI.c (T/K)	1913..2946 °C: log (P/Pa) = 12.625 - 33800 / (T/K)											
SMI.c (T/K)	2677	2908	3181									
45 Rh rhodium
use (T/K)	2288	2496	2749		3063			3405			3997	
CRC.b (T/°C)	2015	2223	2476		2790			3132			3724	
CR2	solid, 298 K to m.p.: log (P/Pa) = 15.174 - 29010 / (T/K) - 0.7068 log (T/K)											
CR2 (T/K)	liquid, m.p. to 2500 K: log (P/Pa) = 11.808 - 26792 / (T/K)											
CR2 (T/K)	2269.0	2478.9										
SMI.c (T/K)	1681..2607 °C: log (P/Pa) = 12.675 - 30400 / (T/K)											
SMI.c (T/K)	2398	2604	2848									
46 Pd palladium
use (T/K)	1721	1897	2117		2395			2753			3234	
CRC.b (T/°C)	1448 (s)	1624	1844		2122			2480			2961	
CR2 (T/K)	solid, 298 K to m.p.: log (P/Pa) = 14.508 - 19813 / (T/K) - 0.9258 log (T/K)											
CR2 (T/K)	1721.0											
CR2 (T/K)	liquid, m.p. to 2100 K: log (P/Pa) = 10.432 - 17899 / (T/K)											
CR2 (T/K)		1897.7										
SMI.c (T/K)	1156..2000 °C: log (P/Pa) = 10.585 - 19230 / (T/K)											
SMI.c (T/K)	1817	2006	2240									
47 Ag silver
use (T/K)	1283	1413	1575		1782			2055			2433	
CRC.b (T/°C)	1010	1140	1302		1509			1782			2160	
CR2	solid, 298 K to m.p.: log (P/Pa) = 14.133 - 14999 / (T/K) - 0.7845 log (T/K)											
CR2 (T/K)	liquid, m.p. to 1600 K: log (P/Pa) = 10.758 - 13827 / (T/K)											
CR2 (T/K)	1285.3	1417.0	1578.8									
KAL (T/K)				1640	1790	1865	1970	2060	2160	2310		2440
SMI.a	solid, 767..961 °C: log (P/Pa) = 11.405 - 14850 / (T/K)											
SMI.a (T/K)	liquid, 961..1353 °C: log (P/Pa) = 10.785 - 14090 / (T/K)											
SMI.a (T/K)	1306	1440	1604									
48 Cd cadmium
use (T/K)	530	583	654		745			867			1040	
CRC.b (T/°C)	257 (s)	310 (s)	381		472			594			767	
CR2 (T/K)	solid, 298 K to m.p.: log (P/Pa) = 10.945 - 5799 / (T/K)											
CR2 (T/K)	529.8	583.1										
CR2 (T/K)	liquid, m.p. to 650 K: log (P/Pa) = 10.248 - 5392 / (T/K)											
CR2 (T/K)			653.7									
KAL (T/K)				683	748	781	829	870	915	983		1045
SMI.a (T/K)	solid, 148..321 °C: log (P/Pa) = 10.905 - 5798 / (T/K)											
SMI.a (T/K)	532	585										
49 In indium
use (T/K)	1196	1325	1485		1690			1962			2340	
CRC.b (T/°C)	923	1052	1212		1417			1689			2067	
CR2	solid, 298 K to m.p.: log (P/Pa) = 10.997 - 12548 / (T/K)											
CR2 (T/K)	liquid, m.p. to 1500 K: log (P/Pa) = 10.380 - 12276 / (T/K)											
CR2 (T/K)	1182.7	1308.7	1464.9									
SMI.c,m (T/K)	liquid, 667..1260 °C: log (P/Pa) = 10.055 - 12150 / (T/K)											
SMI.c,m (T/K)	1208	1342	1508									
50 Sn tin
use (T/K)	1497	1657	1855		2107			2438			2893	
CRC.b (T/°C)	1224	1384	1582		1834			2165			2620	
CR2	solid, 298 K to m.p.: log (P/Pa) = 11.042 - 15710 / (T/K)											
CR2 (T/K)	liquid, m.p. to 1850 K: log (P/Pa) = 10.268 - 15332 / (T/K)											
CR2 (T/K)	1493.2	1654.3	1854.4									
KAL (T/K)				1930	2120	2210	2350	2470	2600	2800		2990
SMI.c (T/K)	liquid, 823..1609 °C: log (P/Pa) = 9.095 - 13110 / (T/K)											
SMI.c (T/K)	1441	1620	1848									
51 Sb antimony
use (T/K)	807	876	1011		1219			1491			1858	
CRC.b,c (T/°C)	534 (s)	603 (s)	738		946			1218			1585	
KAL (T/K)				1065	1220	1295	1405	1495	1595	1740		1890
SMI.c (T/K)	466..904 °C: log (P/Pa) = 10.545 - 9913 / (T/K)											
SMI.c (T/K)	940	1039	1160									
52 Te tellurium
use (T/K)			(775)		(888)			1042			1266	
CRC.d (T/°C)			502 (e)		615 (e)			768.8			992.4	
KAL (T/K)				806	888	929	990	1040	1100	1190		1270
53 I iodine (rhombic)
use (T/K)	260	282	309		342			381			457	
CRC.a,b (T/°C)	-12.8 (s)	9.3 (s)	35.9 (s)		68.7 (s)			108 (s)			184.0	
KAL (T/K)				318 (s)	341.8 (s)	353.1 (s)	369.3 (s)	382.7 (s)	400.8	430.6		457.5
54 Xe xenon
use (T/K)	83	92	103		117			137			165	
CRC.d,m (T/°C)	-190 (s)	-181 (s)	-170 (s)		-155.8 (s)			-136.6 (s)			-108.4	
KAL (T/K)				107 (s)	117.3 (s)	122.5 (s)	130.1 (s)	136.6 (s)	143.8 (s)	154.7 (s)		165.0
55 Cs caesium
use (T/K)	418	469	534		623			750			940	
CRC.f,k (T/°C)	144.5	195.6	260.9		350.0			477.1			667.0	
CR2	solid, 298 K to m.p.: log (P/Pa) = 9.717 - 3999 / (T/K)											
CR2 (T/K)	liquid, m.p. to 550 K: log (P/Pa) = 9.171 - 3830 / (T/K)											
CR2 (T/K)	417.6	468.7	534.1									
KAL (T/K)				559	624	657	708	752	802	883		959
SMI.e (T/K)	liquid, 45..277 °C: log (P/Pa) = 8.985 - 3774 / (T/K)											
SMI.e (T/K)	420	473	540									
56 Ba barium
use (T/K)	911	1038	1185		1388			1686			2170	
CRC.e (T/°C)	638 (s)	765	912		1115			1413			1897	
CR2 (T/K)	solid, 298 K to m.p.: log (P/Pa) = 17.411 - 9690 / (T/K) - 2.2890 log (T/K)											
CR2 (T/K)	911.0											
CR2 (T/K)	liquid, m.p. to 1200 K: log (P/Pa) = 9.013 - 8163 / (T/K)											
CR2 (T/K)		1018.7	1164.0									
KAL (T/K)				1165	1290	1360	1455	1540	1635	1780		1910
SMI.c (T/K)	418..858 °C: log (P/Pa) = 10.005 - 8908 / (T/K)											
SMI.c (T/K)	890	989	1113									
57 La lanthanum
use (T/K)	(2005)	(2208)	(2458)		(2772)			(3178)			(3726)	
CRC.c (T/°C)	1732 (i)	1935 (i)	2185 (i)		2499 (i)			2905 (i)			3453 (i)	
CR2	solid, 298 K to m.p.: log (P/Pa) = 12.469 - 22551 / (T/K) - 0.3142 log (T/K)											
CR2 (T/K)	liquid, m.p. to 2450 K: log (P/Pa) = 10.917 - 21855 / (T/K)											
CR2 (T/K)	2001.9	2203.8	2450.9									
SMI.c (T/K)	liquid, 1023..1754 °C: log (P/Pa) = 11.005 - 18000 / (T/K)											
SMI.c (T/K)	1636	1799	1999									
58 Ce cerium
use (T/K)	1992	2194	2442		2754			3159			3705	
CRC.g (T/°C)	1719	1921	2169		2481			2886			3432	
CR2	solid, 298 K to m.p.: log (P/Pa) = 11.145 - 21752 / (T/K)											
CR2 (T/K)	liquid, m.p. to 2450 K: log (P/Pa) = 10.617 - 21200 / (T/K)											
CR2 (T/K)	1996.8	2204.4	2460.3									
SMI.c (T/K)	liquid, 1004..1599 °C: log (P/Pa) = 12.865 - 20100 / (T/K)											
SMI.c (T/K)	1562	1694	1850									
59 Pr praseodymium
use (T/K)	1771	1973	(2227)		(2571)			(3054)			(3779)	
CRC.c (T/°C)	1497.7	1699.4	1954 (i)		2298 (i)			2781 (i)			3506 (i)	
CR2	solid, 298 K to m.p.: log (P/Pa) = 13.865 - 18720 / (T/K) - 0.9512 log (T/K)											
CR2 (T/K)	liquid, m.p. to 2200 K: log (P/Pa) = 9.778 - 17315 / (T/K)											
CR2 (T/K)	1770.8	1972.5										
60 Nd neodymium
use (T/K)	1595	1774	1998		(2296)			(2715)			(3336)	
CRC.c (T/°C)	1322.3	1501.2	1725.3		2023 (i)			2442 (i)			3063 (i)	
CR2	solid, 298 K to m.p.: log (P/Pa) = 14.002 - 17264 / (T/K) - 0.9519 log (T/K)											
CR2 (T/K)	liquid, m.p. to 2000 K: log (P/Pa) = 9.918 - 15824 / (T/K)											
CR2 (T/K)	1595.5	1774.4	1998.5									
62 Sm samarium
use (T/K)	1001	1106	1240		(1421)			(1675)			(2061)	
CRC.c (T/°C)	728 (s)	833 (s)	967 (s)		1148 (i)			1402 (i)			1788 (i)	
CR2 (T/K)	solid, 298 K to m.p.: log (P/Pa) = 14.994 - 11034 / (T/K) - 1.3287 log (T/K)											
CR2 (T/K)	1002.5	1109.2	1242.2	1289.0								
63 Eu europium
use (T/K)	863	957	1072		1234			1452			1796	
CRC.g (T/°C)	590 (s)	684 (s)	799 (s)		961			1179			1523	
CR2 (T/K)	solid, 298 K to m.p.: log (P/Pa) = 14.246 - 9459 / (T/K) - 1.1661 log (T/K)											
CR2 (T/K)	874.6	968.8	1086.5									
64 Gd gadolinium
use (T/K)	(1836)	(2028)	(2267)		(2573)			(2976)			(3535)	
CRC.c (T/°C)	1563 (i)	1755 (i)	1994 (i)		2300 (i)			2703 (i)			3262 (i)	
CR2	solid, 298 K to m.p.: log (P/Pa) = 13.350 - 20861 / (T/K) - 0.5775 log (T/K)											
CR2 (T/K)	liquid, m.p. to 2250 K: log (P/Pa) = 10.563 - 19389 / (T/K)											
CR2 (T/K)	1835.6	2027.5	2264.3									
65 Tb terbium
use (T/K)	1789	1979	(2201)		(2505)			(2913)			(3491)	
CRC.c (T/°C)	1516.1	1706.1	1928 (i)		2232 (i)			2640 (i)			3218 (i)	
CR2	solid, 298 K to m.p.: log (P/Pa) = 14.516 - 20457 / (T/K) - 0.9247 log (T/K)											
CR2 (T/K)	liquid, m.p. to 2200 K: log (P/Pa) = 10.417 - 18639 / (T/K)											
CR2 (T/K)	1789.3	1979.3	2214.4									
66 Dy dysprosium
use (T/K)	1378	1523	(1704)		(1954)			(2304)			(2831)	
CRC.c (T/°C)	1105 (s)	1250 (s)	1431 (i)		1681 (i)			2031 (i)			2558 (i)	
CR2 (T/K)	solid, 298 K to m.p.: log (P/Pa) = 14.585 - 15336 / (T/K) - 1.1114 log (T/K)											
CR2 (T/K)	1382.3	1526.5										
67 Ho holmium
use (T/K)	1432	1584	(1775)		(2040)			(2410)			(2964)	
CRC.c (T/°C)	1159 (s)	1311 (s)	1502 (i)		1767 (i)			2137 (i)			2691 (i)	
CR2 (T/K)	solid, 298 K to m.p.: log (P/Pa) = 14.791 - 15899 / (T/K) - 1.1753 log (T/K)											
CR2 (T/K)	1434.8	1585.2										
68 Er erbium
use (T/K)	1504	1663	(1885)		(2163)			(2552)			(3132)	
CRC.c (T/°C)	1231 (s)	1390 (s)	1612 (i)		1890 (i)			2279 (i)			2859 (i)	
CR2 (T/K)	solid, 298 K to m.p.: log (P/Pa) = 14.922 - 16642 / (T/K) - 1.2154 log (T/K)											
CR2 (T/K)	1504.7	1663.0										
CR2 (T/K)	liquid, m.p. to 1900 K: log (P/Pa) = 9.674 - 14380 / (T/K)											
CR2 (T/K)			1873.9									
69 Tm thulium
use (T/K)	1117	1235	1381		1570			(1821)			(2217)	
CRC.c (T/°C)	844 (s)	962 (s)	1108 (s)		1297 (s)			1548 (i)			1944 (i)	
CR2 (T/K)	solid, 298 K to 1400 K: log (P/Pa) = 13.888 - 12270 / (T/K) - 0.9564 log (T/K)											
CR2 (T/K)	1118.3	1235.5	1381.0									
70 Yb ytterbium
use (T/K)	736	813	910		1047			(1266)			(1465)	
CRC.c (T/°C)	463 (s)	540 (s)	637 (s)		774 (s)			993 (i)			1192 (i)	
CR2 (T/K)	solid, 298 K to 900 K: log (P/Pa) = 14.117 - 8111 / (T/K) - 1.0849 log (T/K)											
CR2 (T/K)	737.0	814.4										
71 Lu lutetium
use (T/K)	1906	2103	2346		(2653)			(3072)			(3663)	
CRC.c (T/°C)	1633 (s)	1829.8	2072.8		2380 (i)			2799 (i)			3390 (i)	
CR2 (T/K)	solid, 298 K to m.p.: log (P/Pa) = 13.799 - 22423 / (T/K) - 0.6200 log (T/K)											
CR2 (T/K)	1905.9											
CR2 (T/K)	liquid, m.p. to 2350 K: log (P/Pa) = 10.654 - 20302 / (T/K)											
CR2 (T/K)		2103.0	2346.0									
72 Hf hafnium
use (T/K)	2689	2954	3277		3679			4194			4876	
CRC.e (T/°C)	2416	2681	3004		3406			3921			4603	
CR2	solid, 298 K to m.p.: log (P/Pa) = 14.451 - 32482 / (T/K) - 0.6735 log (T/K)											
73 Ta tantalum
use (T/K)	3297	3597	3957		4395			4939			5634	
CRC.b (T/°C)	3024	3324	3684		4122			4666			5361	
CR2	solid, 248 K to 2500 K: log (P/Pa) = 21.813 - 41346 / (T/K) - 3.2152 log (T/K) + 0.7437 (T/K) 10^{−3}											
SMI.o,p	solid, 2407..2820 °C: log (P/Pa) = 12.125 - 40210 / (T/K)											
74 W tungsten
use (T/K)	3477	3773	4137		4579			5127			5823	
CRC.b (T/°C)	3204 (s)	3500	3864		4306			4854			5550	
CR2	solid, 298 K to 2350 K: log (P/Pa) = 7.951 - 44094 / (T/K) + 1.3677 log (T/K)											
CR2	solid, 2200 K to 2500 K: log (P/Pa) = -49.521 - 57687 / (T/K) - 12.2231 log (T/K)											
KAL (T/K)				4300	4630	4790	5020	5200	5400	5690		5940
SMI.s (T/K)	solid, 2554..3309 °C: log (P/Pa) = 11.365 - 40260 / (T/K)											
SMI.s (T/K)	3542											
75 Re rhenium
use (T/K)	3303	3614	4009		4500			5127			5954	
CRC.b (T/°C)	3030 (s)	3341	3736		4227			4854			5681	
CR2	solid, 298 K to 2500 K: log (P/Pa) = 16.549 - 40726 / (T/K) - 1.1629 log (T/K)											
76 Os osmium
use (T/K)	3160	3423	3751		4148			4638			5256	
CRC.b (T/°C)	2887 (s)	3150	3478		3875			4365			4983	
CR2	solid, 298 K to 2500 K: log (P/Pa) = 14.425 - 41198 / (T/K) - 0.3896 log (T/K)											
SMI.c (T/K)	2101..3221 °C: log (P/Pa) = 12.715 - 37000 / (T/K)											
SMI.c (T/K)	2910	3158	3453									
77 Ir iridium
use (T/K)	2713	2957	3252		3614			4069			4659	
CRC.b (T/°C)	2440 (s)	2684	2979		3341			3796			4386	
CR2	solid, 298 K to 2500 K: log (P/Pa) = 15.512 - 35099 / (T/K) - 0.7500 log (T/K)											
SMI.c (T/K)	1993..3118 °C: log (P/Pa) = 12.185 - 34110 / (T/K)											
SMI.c (T/K)	2799	3050	3349									
78 Pt platinum
use (T/K)	2330	(2550)	2815		3143			3556			4094	
CRC.b (T/°C)	2057	2277 (e)	2542		2870			3283			3821	
CR2	solid, 298 K to m.p.: log (P/Pa) = 4.888 - 29387 / (T/K) + 1.1039 log (T/K) - 0.4527 (T/K) 10^{−3}											
CR2 (T/K)	liquid, m.p. to 2500 K: log (P/Pa) = 11.392 - 26856 / (T/K)											
CR2 (T/K)	2357.4											
KAL (T/K)				2910	3150	3260	3420	3560	3700	3910		4090
SMI.c (T/K)	1606..2582 °C: log (P/Pa) = 11.758 - 27500 / (T/K)											
SMI.c (T/K)	2339	2556	2818									
79 Au gold
use (T/K)	1646	1814	2021		2281			2620			3078	
CRC.b (T/°C)	1373	1541	1748		2008			2347			2805	
CR2	solid, 298 K to m.p.: log (P/Pa) = 14.158 - 19343 / (T/K) - 0.7479 log (T/K)											
CR2 (T/K)	liquid, m.p. to 2050 K: log (P/Pa) = 10.838 - 18024 / (T/K)											
CR2 (T/K)	1663.0	1832.1	2039.4									
KAL (T/K)				2100	2290	2390	2520	2640	2770	2960		3120
SMI.a (T/K)	1083..1867 °C: log (P/Pa) = 10.775 - 18520 / (T/K)											
SMI.a (T/K)	1719	1895	2111									
80 Hg mercury
use (T/K)	315	350	393		449			523			629	
CRC.j,k (T/°C)	42.0	76.6	120.0		175.6			250.3			355.9	
CR2 (T/K)	liquid, 298 K to 400 K: log (P/Pa) = 10.122 - 3190 / (T/K)											
CR2 (T/K)	315.2	349.7	392.8									
KAL (T/K)				408	448.8	468.8	498.4	523.4	551.2	592.9		629.8
81 Tl thallium
use (T/K)	882	977	1097		1252			1461			1758	
CRC.b (T/°C)	609	704	824		979			1188			1485	
CR2	solid, 298 K to m.p.: log (P/Pa) = 10.977 - 9447 / (T/K)											
CR2 (T/K)	liquid, m.p. to 1100 K: log (P/Pa) = 10.265 - 9037 / (T/K)											
CR2 (T/K)	880.4	975.4	1093.4									
KAL (T/K)				1125	1235	1290	1370	1440	1515	1630		1730
SMI.a (T/K)	liquid, 405..821 °C: log (P/Pa) = 10.275 - 8920 / (T/K)											
SMI.a (T/K)	868	962	1078									
82 Pb lead
use (T/K)	978	1088	1229		1412			1660			2027	
CRC.b (T/°C)	705	815	956		1139			1387			1754	
CR2	solid, 298 K to m.p.: log (P/Pa) = 10.649 - 10143 / (T/K)											
CR2 (T/K)	liquid, m.p. to 1200 K: log (P/Pa) = 9.917 - 9701 / (T/K)											
CR2 (T/K)	978.2	1087.9										
KAL (T/K)				1285	1420	1485	1585	1670	1760	1905		2030
SMI.a (T/K)	liquid, 483..975 °C: log (P/Pa) = 9.815 - 9600 / (T/K)											
SMI.a (T/K)	978	1089	1228									
83 Bi bismuth
use (T/K)	941	1041	1165		1325			1538			1835	
CRC.b (T/°C)	668	768	892		1052			1265			1562	
KAL (T/K)				1225	1350	1410	1505	1580	1670	1800		1920
SMI.c (T/K)	liquid, 474..934 °C: log (P/Pa) = 10.265 - 9824 / (T/K)											
SMI.c (T/K)	957	1060	1189									
84 Po polonium
use (T/K)					(846)			1003			1236	
CRC.d (T/°C)					573 (e)			730.2			963.3	
85 At astatine
use (T/K)	361	392	429		475			531			607	
CRC.b (T/°C)	88 (s)	119 (s)	156 (s)		202 (s)			258 (s)			334	
86 Rn radon
use (T/K)	110	121	134		152			176			211	
CRC.d (T/°C)	-163 (s)	-152 (s)	-139 (s)		-121.4 (s)			-97.6 (s)			-62.3	
KAL (T/K)				139 (s)	152 (s)	158 (s)	168 (s)	176 (s)	184 (s)	198 (s)		211
87 Fr francium
use (T/K)	(404)	(454)	(519)		(608)			(738)			(946)	
CRC.b (T/°C)	131 (e)	181 (e)	246 (e)		335 (e)			465 (e)			673 (e)	
88 Ra radium
use (T/K)	819	906	1037		1209			1446			1799	
CRC.b (T/°C)	546 (s)	633 (s)	764		936			1173			1526	
90 Th thorium
use (T/K)	2633	2907	3248		3683			4259			5055	
CRC.b (T/°C)	2360	2634	2975		3410			3986			4782	
CR2	solid, 298 K to m.p.: log (P/Pa) = 13.674 - 31483 / (T/K) - 0.5288 log (T/K)											
CR2	liquid, m.p. to 2500 K: log (P/Pa) = -13.447 - 24569 / (T/K) + 6.6473 log (T/K)											
SMI.c (T/K)	1686..2715 °C: log (P/Pa) = 11.645 - 28440 / (T/K)											
SMI.c (T/K)	2442	2672	2949									
91 Pa protactinium
CR2	solid, 298 K to m.p.: log (P/Pa) = 15.558 - 34869 / (T/K) - 1.0075 log (T/K)											
CR2	liquid, m.p. to 2500 K: log (P/Pa) = 11.183 - 32874 / (T/K)											
92 U uranium
use (T/K)	2325	2564	2859		3234			3727			4402	
CRC.b (T/°C)	2052	2291	2586		2961			3454			4129	
CR2	solid, 298 K to m.p.: log (P/Pa) = 5.776 - 27729 / (T/K) + 2.6982 log (T/K) - 1.5471 (T/K) 10^{−3}											
CR2 (T/K)	liquid, m.p. to 2500 K: log (P/Pa) = 25.741 - 28776 / (T/K) - 4.0962 log (T/K)											
CR2 (T/K)	2422.6											
SMI.c (T/K)	liquid, 1461..2338 °C: log (P/Pa) = 12.005 - 25800 / (T/K)											
SMI.c (T/K)	2149	2344	2579									
93 Np neptunium
use (T/K)	2194	2437										
CR2	solid, 298 K to m.p.: log (P/Pa) = 24.649 - 24886 / (T/K) - 3.9991 log (T/K)											
CR2 (T/K)	liquid, m.p. to 2500 K: log (P/Pa) = 15.082 - 23378 / (T/K) - 1.3250 log (T/K)											
CR2 (T/K)	2194.1	2436.6										
94 Pu plutonium
use (T/K)	1756	1953	2198		2511			2926			3499	
CRC.b (T/°C)	1483	1680	1925		2238			2653			3226	
CR2	solid, 500 K to m.p.: log (P/Pa) = 23.864 - 18460 / (T/K) - 4.4720 log (T/K)											
CR2	solid, 298 K to 600 K: log (P/Pa) = 31.166 - 19162 / (T/K) - 6.6675 log (T/K)											
CR2 (T/K)	liquid, m.p. to 2450 K: log (P/Pa) = 8.672 - 16658 / (T/K)											
CR2 (T/K)	1920.9	2171.3										
95 Am americium
use (T/K)	1239	1356										
CR2 (T/K)	solid, 298 K to m.p.: log (P/Pa) = 16.317 - 15059 / (T/K) - 1.3449 log (T/K)											
CR2 (T/K)	1238.7	1356.1										
96 Cm curium
use (T/K)	1788	1982										
CR2	solid, 298 K to m.p.: log (P/Pa) = 13.375 - 20364 / (T/K) - 0.5770 log (T/K)											
CR2 (T/K)	liquid, m.p. to 2200 K: log (P/Pa) = 10.229 - 18292 / (T/K)											
CR2 (T/K)	1788.2	1982.0										

== Notes ==
- Values are given in terms of temperature necessary to reach the specified pressure.
- Valid results within the quoted ranges from most equations are included in the table for comparison.
- A conversion factor is included into the original first coefficients of the equations to provide the pressure in pascals (CR2: 5.006, SMI: -0.875).
- Ref. SMI uses temperature scale ITS-48. No conversion was done, which should be of little consequence however.
- The temperature at standard pressure should be equal to the normal boiling point, but due to the considerable spread does not necessarily have to match values reported elsewhere.
- log refers to log base 10
- (T/K) refers to temperature in Kelvin (K)
- (P/Pa) refers to pressure in Pascal (Pa)
