= Hardnesses of the elements (data page) =

number	symbol	name	Mohs hardness	Vickers hardness (MPa)	Brinell hardness (MPa)	Brinell hardness (MPa) (Note: Hardness can vary by several hundred percent depending on the pretreatment, see e.g. Iron#Mechanical properties and Angelo Basile; Fausto Gallucci (2011). Membranes for Membrane Reactors: Preparation, Optimization and Selection. John Wiley & Sons. pp. 30–. ISBN 978-0-470-74652-3.)
3	Li	lithium	0.6		5	
4	Be	beryllium	5.5	1670	590–1320	
5	B	boron	9.3–9.5	4900–5800		
6	C	carbon (graphite)	0.5			
6	C	carbon (diamond)	10.0			
11	Na	sodium	0.5		0.69	
12	Mg	magnesium	2.5		260	44 (cast)
13	Al	aluminium	2.75	160–350	160–550	184
14	Si	silicon	6.5			
16	S	sulfur	2.0			
19	K	potassium	0.4		0.363	
20	Ca	calcium	1.75		170	416
21	Sc	scandium			736–1200	
22	Ti	titanium	6.0	830–3420	716–2770	1028
23	V	vanadium	7.0	628–640	600–628	742
24	Cr	chromium	8.5	1060	687–6500	688
25	Mn	manganese	6.0		196	
26	Fe	iron	4.0	608	200–1180	
27	Co	cobalt	5.0	1043	470–3000	1291
28	Ni	nickel	4.0	638	667–1600	900–1200
29	Cu	copper	3.0	343–369	235–878	520
30	Zn	zinc	2.5		327–412	480–520
31	Ga	gallium	1.5		56.8–68.7	
32	Ge	germanium	6.0			
33	As	arsenic	3.5		1440	
34	Se	selenium	2.0		736	
37	Rb	rubidium	0.3		0.216	
38	Sr	strontium	1.5			
39	Y	yttrium			200–589	
40	Zr	zirconium	5.0	820–1800	638–1880	333
41	Nb	niobium	6.0	870–1320	735–2450	735
42	Mo	molybdenum	5.5	1400–2740	1370–2500	1340 (cast)
44	Ru	ruthenium	6.5	2298	2160	1795
45	Rh	rhodium	6.0	1100–8000	980–1350	540
46	Pd	palladium	4.75	400–600	320–610	310
47	Ag	silver	2.5	250	245–250	206
48	Cd	cadmium	2.0		203–220	196
49	In	indium	1.2		8.83–10	9.8
50	Sn	tin	1.5		51–75	292–441 (cast)
51	Sb	antimony	3.0		294–384	
52	Te	tellurium	2.25		180–270	
55	Cs	caesium	0.2		0.147	
56	Ba	barium	1.25			
57	La	lanthanum	2.5	360–1750	350–400	
58	Ce	cerium	2.5	210–470	186–412	
59	Pr	praseodymium	1.6	250–746	250–638	
60	Nd	neodymium		343–746	265–700	
61	Pm	promethium		617.8		
62	Sm	samarium		412–441	441–600	
63	Eu	europium		167–200		
64	Gd	gadolinium		510–950		
65	Tb	terbium		450–863	677–1200	
66	Dy	dysprosium		412–550	500–1050	
67	Ho	holmium		412–600	500–1250	
68	Er	erbium	2.0	432–700	600–1070	
69	Tm	thulium		470–650	471–900	
70	Yb	ytterbium		206–250	343–441	
71	Lu	lutetium		755–1160	893–1300	
72	Hf	hafnium	5.5	1520–2060	1450–2100	
73	Ta	tantalum	6.5	873–1200	441–3430	441–1224
74	W	tungsten	7.5	3430–4600	2000–4000	1960–2450
75	Re	rhenium	7.0	1350–7850	1320–2500	
76	Os	osmium	7.0		3920–4000	3487
77	Ir	iridium	6.5	1760–2200	1670	2120
78	Pt	platinum	3.5	400–549	310–500	299
79	Au	gold	2.5	188–216	188–245	189
80	Hg	mercury	1.5			
81	Tl	thallium	1.2		26.5–44.7	
82	Pb	lead	1.5		38–50	37.5–41.8 (cast)
83	Bi	bismuth	2.25		70–94.2	70
90	Th	thorium	3.0	294–687	390–1500	
92	U	uranium	6.0	1960–2500	2350–3850	

== See also ==
- Mohs scale of mineral hardness
- Mohs hardness of materials (data page)
- Vickers hardness test
- Brinell scale
