= Critical points of the elements (data page) =

Chemical data page

== Critical point ==
ref	T_{c}(K)	T_{c}(°C)	P_{c}(MPa)	P_{c}(other)	V_{c}(cm^{3}/mol)	ρ_{c}(g/cm^{3})
1 H hydrogen
use	32.97	−240.18	1.293			
CRC.a	32.97	−240.18	1.293		65	
KAL	33.2		1.297		65.0	
SMI		−239.9		13.2 kgf/cm^{2}		0.0310
1 H hydrogen (equilibrium)
LNG		−240.17	1.294	12.77 atm	65.4	0.0308
1 H hydrogen (normal)
LNG		−239.91	1.297	12.8 atm	65.0	0.0310
1 D deuterium
KAL	38.2		1.65		60	
1 D deuterium (equilibrium)
LNG		−234.8	1.650	16.28 atm	60.4	0.0668
1 D deuterium (normal)
LNG		−234.7	1.665	16.43 atm	60.3	0.0669
2 He helium
use	5.19	−267.96	0.227			
CRC.a	5.19	−267.96	0.227		57	
KAL	5.19		0.227		57.2	
SMI		−267.9		2.34 kgf/cm^{2}		0.0693
2 He helium (equilibrium)
LNG		−267.96	0.2289	2.261 atm		0.06930
2 He helium-3
LNG		−269.85	0.1182	1.13 atm	72.5	0.0414
2 He helium-4
LNG		−267.96	0.227	2.24 atm	57.3	0.0698
3 Li lithium
use	(3223)	(2950)	(67)			
CRC.b	(3223)	2950	(67)		(66)	
7 N nitrogen
use	126.21	−146.94	3.39			
CRC.a	126.21	−146.94	3.39		90	
KAL	126.2		3.39		89.5	
SMI		−147.1		34.7 kgf/cm^{2}		0.3110
7 N nitrogen-14
LNG		−146.94	3.39	33.5 atm	89.5	0.313
7 N nitrogen-15
LNG		−146.8	3.39	33.5 atm	90.4	0.332
8 O oxygen
use	154.59	−118.56	5.043			
CRC.a	154.59	−118.56	5.043		73	
LNG		−118.56	5.043	49.77 atm	73.4	0.436
KAL	154.6		5.04		73.4	
SMI		−118.8		51.4 kgf/cm^{2}		0.430
9 F fluorine
use	144.13	−129.02	5.172			
CRC.a	144.13	−129.02	5.172		66	
LNG		−129.0	5.215	51.47 atm	66.2	0.574
KAL	144.3		5.22		66	
10 Ne neon
use	44.4	−228.7	2.76			
CRC.a	44.4	−228.7	2.76		42	
LNG		−228.71	2.77	27.2 atm	41.7	0.4835
KAL	44.4		2.76		41.7	
SMI		−228.7		26.8 kgf/cm^{2}		0.484
11 Na sodium
use	(2573)	(2300)	(35)			
CRC.b	(2573)	2300	(35)		(116)	
15 P phosphorus
use	994	721				
CRC.a	994	721				
LNG		721				
16 S sulfur
use	1314	1041	20.7			
CRC.a	1314	1041	20.7			
LNG		1041	11.7	116 atm		
KAL	1314		20.7			
SMI		1040				
17 Cl chlorine
use	416.9	143.8	7.991			
CRC.a	416.9	143.8	7.991		123	
LNG		143.8	7.71	76.1 atm	124	0.573
KAL	416.9		7.98		124	
SMI		144.0		78.7 kgf/cm^{2}		0.573
18 Ar argon
use	150.87	−122.28	4.898			
CRC.a	150.87	−122.28	4.898		75	
LNG		−122.3	4.87	48.1 atm	74.6	0.536
KAL	150.9		4.90		74.6	
SMI		−122		49.7 kgf/cm^{2}		0.531
19 K potassium
use	(2223)	(1950)	(16)			
CRC.b	(2223)	1950	(16)		(209)	
33 As arsenic
use	1673	1400				
CRC.a	1673	1400			35	
LNG		1400				
34 Se selenium
use	1766	1493	27.2			
CRC.a	1766	1493	27.2			
LNG		1493				
35 Br bromine
use	588	315	10.34			
CRC.a	588	315	10.34		127	
LNG		315	10.3	102 atm	135	1.184
KAL	588		10.3		127	
SMI		302				1.18
36 Kr krypton
use	209.41	−63.74	5.50			
CRC.a	209.41	−63.74	5.50		91	
LNG		−63.75	5.50	54.3 atm	91.2	0.9085
KAL	209.4		5.50		91.2	
37 Rb rubidium
use	(2093)	(1820)	(16)			
CRC.b	(2093)	1820	(16)		(247)	
LNG		1832			250	0.34
53 I iodine
use	819	546	11.7			
CRC.a	819	546			155	
LNG		546	11.7	115 atm	155	0.164
KAL	819				155	
SMI		553				
54 Xe xenon
use	289.77	16.62	5.841			
CRC.c	289.77	16.62	5.841		118	
LNG		16.583	5.84	57.64 atm	118	1.105
KAL	289.7		5.84		118	
SMI		16.6		60.2 kgf/cm^{2}		1.155
55 Cs caesium
use	1938	1665	9.4			
CRC.d	1938	1665	9.4		341	
LNG		1806			300	0.44
80 Hg mercury
use	1750	1477	172.00			
CRC.a	1750	1477	172.00		43	
LNG		1477	160.8	1587 atm		
KAL	1750		172		42.7	
SMI		1460±20		1640±50 kgf/cm^{2}		0.5
86 Rn radon
use	377	104	6.28			
CRC.a	377	104	6.28			
LNG		104	6.28	62 atm	139	1.6
KAL	377		6.3			
SMI		104		64.1 kgf/cm^{2}		
