= Self-consistent mean field =

Self-consistent mean field may be one of the following:

- Mean field theory, an approach to the many-body problem in physics and statistical mechanics
- Self-consistent mean field (biology), an application of this theory to the problem of protein structure prediction
