= Tricritical point =

A tricritical point is a point where a second order phase transition curve meets a first order phase transition curve. The notion was first introduced by Lev Landau in 1937, who referred to the tricritical point as the critical point of the continuous transition. The first example of a tricritical point was shown by Robert B. Griffiths in a helium-3 helium-4 mixture. In condensed matter physics, dealing with the macroscopic physical properties of matter, a tricritical point is a point in the phase diagram of a system at which three-phase coexistence terminates. This definition is clearly parallel to the definition of an ordinary critical point as the point at which two-phase coexistence terminates.

A point of three-phase coexistence is termed a triple point for a one-component system, since, from Gibbs' phase rule, this condition is only achieved for a single point in the phase diagram (F = 2-3+1 =0). For tricritical points to be observed, one needs a mixture with more components. It can be shown that three is the minimum number of components for which these points can appear. In this case, one may have a two-dimensional region of three-phase coexistence (F = 2-3+3 =2) (thus, each point in this region corresponds to a triple point). This region will terminate in two critical lines of two-phase coexistence; these two critical lines may then terminate at a single tricritical point. This point is therefore "twice critical", since it belongs to two critical branches.
Indeed, its critical behavior is different from that of a conventional critical point: the upper critical dimension is lowered from d=4 to d=3 so the classical exponents turn out to apply for real systems in three dimensions (but not for systems whose spatial dimension is 2 or lower).

== Solid state ==
It seems more convenient experimentally to consider mixtures with four components for which one thermodynamic variable (usually the pressure or the volume) is kept fixed. The situation then reduces to the one described for mixtures of three components.

Historically, it was for a long time unclear whether a superconductor undergoes a first- or a second-order phase transition. The question was finally settled in 1982. If the Ginzburg–Landau parameter $\kappa$ that distinguishes type-I and type-II superconductors (see also here) is large enough, vortex fluctuations become important which drive the transition to second order. The tricritical point lies at roughly $\kappa=0.76/\sqrt{2}$, slightly below the value $\kappa=1/\sqrt{2}$ where type-I goes over into type-II superconductor. The prediction was confirmed in 2002 by Monte Carlo computer simulations.
