= Enthalpy of vaporization =

Energy to convert a liquid substance to a gas at a given pressure

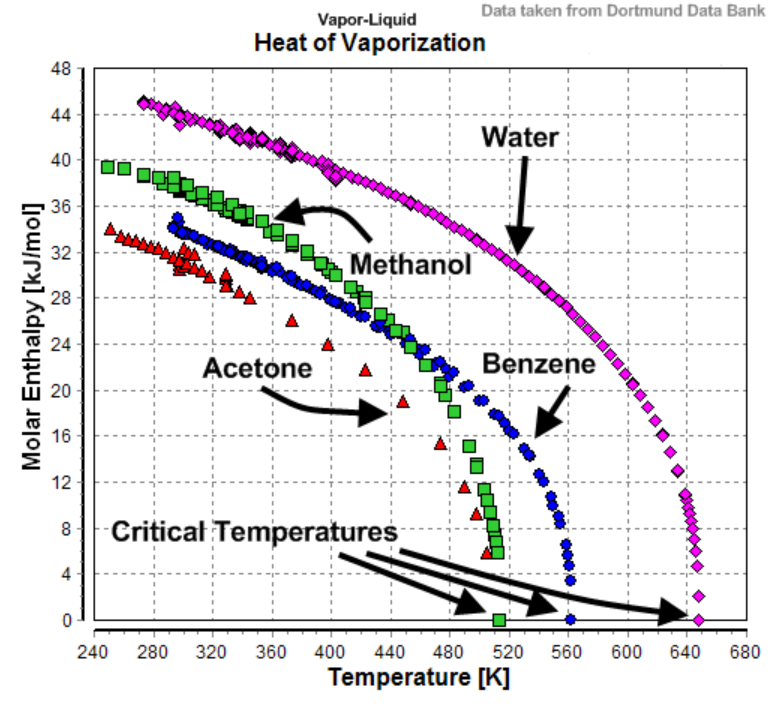
Temperature-dependency of the heats of vaporization for water, methanol, benzene, and acetone

In thermodynamics, the enthalpy of vaporization (symbol ∆_{vap}H), also known as the (latent) heat of vaporization or heat of evaporation, is the amount of energy (enthalpy) that must be added to a liquid substance to transform a quantity of that substance into a gas. The enthalpy of vaporization is a function of the pressure and temperature at which the transformation (vaporization or evaporation) takes place.

The enthalpy of vaporization is often quoted for the normal boiling temperature of the substance. Although tabulated values are usually corrected to 298.15 K (25.00 °C), that correction is often smaller than the uncertainty in the measured value.

The heat of vaporization is temperature-dependent, though a constant heat of vaporization can be assumed for small temperature ranges and for reduced temperature T_{r} ≪ 1. The heat of vaporization diminishes with increasing temperature and it vanishes completely at a certain point called the critical temperature (T_{r} = 1). Above the critical temperature, the liquid and vapor phases are indistinguishable, and the substance is called a supercritical fluid.

== Units ==
Values are usually quoted in J/mol, or kJ/mol (molar enthalpy of vaporization), although kJ/kg, or J/g (specific heat of vaporization), and older units like kcal/mol, cal/g and Btu/lb are sometimes still used among others.

== Enthalpy of condensation ==
The enthalpy of condensation (or heat of condensation) is by definition equal to the enthalpy of vaporization with the opposite sign: enthalpy changes of vaporization are always positive (heat is absorbed by the substance), whereas enthalpy changes of condensation are always negative (heat is released by the substance).

== Thermodynamic background ==
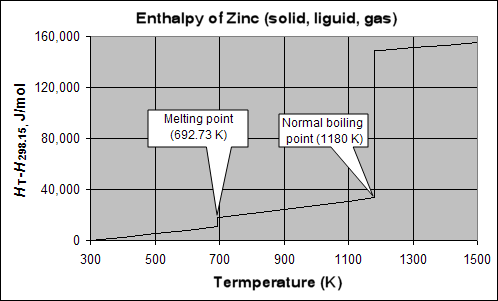
Molar enthalpy of zinc above 298.15 K and at 1 atm pressure, showing discontinuities at the melting and boiling points. The enthalpy of melting (Δ_{m}H^{⦵}) of zinc is 7323 J/mol, and the enthalpy of vaporization (Δ_{vap}H^{⦵}) is 115330 J/mol.

The enthalpy of vaporization can be written as

∆_{vap}H = ∆_{vap}U + p∆V

It is equal to the increased internal energy of the vapor phase compared with the liquid phase, plus the work done against ambient pressure. The increase in the internal energy can be viewed as the energy required to overcome the intermolecular interactions in the liquid (or solid, in the case of sublimation). Hence helium has a particularly low enthalpy of vaporization, 0.0845 kJ/mol, as the van der Waals forces between helium atoms are particularly weak. On the other hand, the molecules in liquid water are held together by relatively strong hydrogen bonds, and its enthalpy of vaporization, 40.65 kJ/mol, is more than five times the energy required to heat the same quantity of water from 0 °C to 100 °C (c_{p} = 75.3 J/(K mol)). Care must be taken, however, when using enthalpies of vaporization to measure the strength of intermolecular forces, as these forces may persist to an extent in the gas phase (as is the case with hydrogen fluoride), and so the calculated value of the bond strength will be too low. This is particularly true for metals, which often form covalently bonded molecules in the gas phase: in these cases, the enthalpy of atomization (∆_{at}H) must be used to obtain a true value of the bond energy.

An alternative description is to view the enthalpy of condensation as the heat which must be released to the surroundings to compensate for the drop in entropy when a gas condenses to a liquid. As the liquid and gas are in equilibrium at the boiling point (T_{b}), Δ_{vap}G = 0, which leads to

∆_{vap}S = S(gas) - S(liquid) = ∆_{vap}H/T_{b}

As neither entropy nor enthalpy vary greatly with temperature, it is normal to use the tabulated standard values without any correction for the difference in temperature from 298.15 K. A correction must be made if the pressure is different from 100 kPa, as the entropy of an ideal gas is proportional to the logarithm of its pressure. The entropies of liquids vary little with pressure, as the coefficient of thermal expansion of a liquid is small. (Note: Note that the rate of change of entropy with pressure and the rate of thermal expansion are related by the Maxwell relation $\left(\frac{\partial S}{\partial P}\right)_T = \left(\frac{\partial V}{\partial T}\right)_P$.)

These two definitions are equivalent: the boiling point is the temperature at which the increased entropy of the gas phase overcomes the intermolecular forces. As a given quantity of matter always has a higher entropy in the gas phase than in a condensed phase (∆_{vap}S is always positive), and from

∆G = ∆H - T∆S

the Gibbs free energy change falls with increasing temperature: gases are favored at higher temperatures, as is observed in practice.

== Vaporization enthalpy of electrolyte solutions ==
Estimation of the enthalpy of vaporization of electrolyte solutions can be simply carried out using equations based on the chemical thermodynamic models, such as Pitzer model or TCPC model.

== Selected values ==
=== Elements ===
Enthalpies of vaporization of the elements
	1	2		3	4	5	6	7	8	9	10	11	12	13	14	15	16	17	18
Group →
↓ Period
1	H0.90																		He0.08
2	Li136	Be292												B508	C715	N5.57	O6.82	F6.62	Ne1.71
3	Na97.4	Mg128												Al284	Si359	P12.4	S45	Cl20.4	Ar6.53
4	K76.9	Ca155		Sc333	Ti425	V444	Cr339	Mn221	Fe340	Co377	Ni379	Cu300	Zn115	Ga256	Ge334	As32.4	Se95.5	Br30.0	Kr9.08
5	Rb75.8	Sr141		Y390	Zr573	Nb690	Mo617	Tc585	Ru619	Rh494	Pd358	Ag254	Cd99.9	In232	Sn296	Sb193	Te114	I41.6	Xe12.6
6	Cs63.9	Ba140	1 asterisk	Lu414	Hf648	Ta733	W807	Re704	Os678	Ir564	Pt510	Au342	Hg59.1	Tl165	Pb179	Bi179	Po103	At54.4	Rn18.1
7	Fr65	Ra113	1 asterisk	Lrn/a	Rfn/a	Dbn/a	Sgn/a	Bhn/a	Hsn/a	Mtn/a	Dsn/a	Rgn/a	Cnn/a	Nhn/a	Fln/a	Mcn/a	Lvn/a	Tsn/a	Ogn/a
1 asterisk				La400	Ce398	Pr331	Nd289	Pm289	Sm172	Eu176	Gd301	Tb391	Dy280	Ho251	Er280	Tm191	Yb129
1 asterisk				Ac400	Th514	Pa481	U417	Np336	Pu333	Amn/a	Cmn/a	Bkn/a	Cfn/a	Esn/a	Fmn/a	Mdn/a	Non/a
	Enthalpy in kJ/mol, measured at their respective normal boiling points
	0–10 kJ/mol			10–100 kJ/mol			100–300 kJ/mol			>300 kJ/mol

The vaporization of metals is a key step in metal vapor synthesis, which exploits the increased reactivity of metal atoms or small particles relative to the bulk elements.

=== Other common substances ===
Enthalpies of vaporization of common substances, measured at their respective standard boiling points:

Compound	Boiling point, at normal pressure			Heat of vaporization	
Compound	(K)	(°C)	(°F)	(kJ/mol)	(J/g)
Acetone	329	56	133	31.300	538.9
Aluminium	2792	2519	4566	284.0	10526
Ammonia	240	−33.34	−28	23.35	1371
Butane	272–274	−1	30–34	22.4	385
Diethyl ether	307.8	34.6	94.3	26.17	353.1
Ethanol	352	78.37	173	38.6	841
Hydrogen (parahydrogen)	20.271	−252.879	−423.182	0.8992	446.1
Iron	3134	2862	5182	340	6090
Isopropyl alcohol	356	82.6	181	44	732.2
Methane	112	−161	−259	8.170	509
Methanol	338	64.7	148	35.2	1104
Propane	231	−42	−44	15.7	356
Phosphine	185	−87.7	−126	14.6	429.4
Water	373.15	100	212	40.66	2257

== See also ==
- Clausius–Clapeyron relation
- Shimansky equation, describes the temperature dependence of the heat of vaporization
- Enthalpy of fusion, specific heat of melting
- Enthalpy of sublimation
- Joback method, estimation of the heat of vaporization at the normal boiling point from molecular structures
- Latent heat
