= Fleer (surname) =

Fleer is a surname. Notable people with the surname include:

- Craig Fleer, Australian rules football umpire
- Frank H. Fleer (1860–1921), American confectioner who is thought to have developed the first bubble gum, founder of Fleer Corporation
- Harry Fleer (1916–1994), American actor
- John Fleer, American chef, cookbook author, and restauranteur
- Marilyn Fleer, Australian professor of early childhood education and development

== See also ==
- Fleer, American chewing gum manufacturer
- Scheutjens–Fleer theory, a lattice-based self-consistent field theory that is the basis for many computational analyses of polymer adsorption
