= Shimansky equation =

Formula for a liquid's heat of vaporization as a function of temperature

In thermodynamics, the Shimansky equation describes the temperature dependence of the heat of vaporization (also known as the enthalpy of vaporization or the heat of evaporation):

$$L = L_0 \tanh\left( \frac{L T_C}{L_0 T}\right)$$

where:

- L is the latent heat of vaporization at the temperature T,
- T_{C} is the critical temperature,
- L_{0} is the parameter that is equal to the heat of vaporization at zero temperature (T → 0),
- tanh is the hyperbolic tangent function.

This equation was obtained in 1955 by Yu. I. Shimansky, at first empirically, and later derived theoretically. The Shimansky equation does not contain any arbitrary constants, since the value of T_{C} can be determined experimentally and L_{0} can be calculated if L has been measured experimentally for at least one given value of temperature T. The Shimansky equation describes quite well the heat of vaporization for a wide variety of liquids. For chemical compounds that belong to the same class (e.g. alcohols) the value of $\tfrac{L_0}{T_C}$ ratio remains constant. For each such class of liquids, the Shimansky equation can be re-written in a form of

$$\frac{L}{AT_C} = \tanh\frac{L}{AT},$$

where $A = \tfrac {L_0}{T_C} = \text{const}.$ The latter formula is a mathematical expression of structural similarity of liquids. The value of T_{C} plays a role of the parameter for a group of curves of temperature dependence of L.

== Sources ==
- Shimansky Yu. I. В«Structure and physical properties of binary solutions of alcohols В», PhD dissertation, Taras Shevchenko State University of Kyiv, 1955;
- Shimansky Yu. I. В«The temperature dependence of the heat of vaporization of pure liquidsВ» Journal of Physical Chemistry (USSR), v. 32(8), p. 1893, 1958;
- Shimanskaya E. T., Shimansky Yu. I. В«Critical state of pure compoundsВ», published by Taras Shevchenko State University of Kyiv, 1961.
