= Ginzburg criterion =

Criterion in mean field theory

Mean field theory gives sensible results as long as one is able to neglect fluctuations in the system under consideration.

If $\phi$ is the order parameter of the system, then mean field theory requires that the fluctuations in the order parameter are much smaller than the actual value of the order parameter near the critical point.

Quantitatively, this means that:

$$\displaystyle\mathcal \langle(\delta \phi)^2\rangle \quad{ \ll }\quad \langle\phi\rangle^2$$

The Ginzburg criterion is a restatement of this inequality through measurable quantities, such as the magnetic susceptibility in the Ising model.

It also gives the idea of an upper critical dimension, a dimensionality of the system above which mean field theory gives proper results, and the critical exponents predicted by mean field theory match exactly with those obtained by numerical methods.

== Example: Ising model ==
One can prove that:

$k_BT\chi \ll \langle M \rangle^2$

Where $k_B$ is the Boltzmann constant, $T$ is the system temperature, $\chi$ is the total magnetic susceptibility and $\langle M \rangle$ is the total average magnetization of the system.

Using this in the Landau theory, which is identical to the mean field theory for the Ising model, the value of the upper critical dimension comes out to be 4. If the dimension of the space is greater than 4, the mean-field results are good and self-consistent. But for dimensions less than 4, the predictions are less accurate. For instance, in one dimension, the mean field approximation predicts a phase transition at finite temperatures for the Ising model, whereas the exact analytic solution in one dimension has none (except for $T=0$ and $T\rightarrow \infty$).

== Example: Classical Heisenberg model ==
In the classical Heisenberg model of magnetism, the order parameter has a higher symmetry, and it has violent directional fluctuations which are more important than the size fluctuations. They overtake to the Ginzburg temperature interval over which fluctuations modify the mean-field description thus replacing the criterion by another, more relevant one.
