= Karen Gleason =

American chemist

Karen Klincewicz Gleason is the Associate Provost at the Massachusetts Institute of Technology, where she has also served as the Alexander and I. Michael Kasser Professor of Chemical Engineering, from 2006–present. She has also previously served as the Associate Dean of Engineering, Associate Director for the Institute of Soldier Nanotechnologies, and Executive Officer of the Chemical Engineering Department. She has invented over 15 patented designs. She has developed a hydrophobic surface that can be applied in energy harvesting.

Gleason was elected a member of the National Academy of Engineering in 2015 for invention, application development, scale-up, and commercialization of chemically vapor deposited polymers.

== Academic life ==
Karen Gleason received her S.B. and S.M. in Chemical Engineering at Massachusetts Institute of Technology in 1982. She earned her Ph.D in Chemical Engineering at the University of California at Berkeley on 1987. During her time as a graduate student, she developed the Klincewicz method.

== Research ==
Professor Gleason's research is on Chemical Vapor Deposition (CVD) of thin polymer films. Gleason's research on CVD has led to novel antifouling coatings for membranes, to inhibit biofilm development, through the use of zwitterionic moieties. She has also made significant advances in other organic surfaces and devices.

== Personal life ==
During her time at MIT, she was the captain of the Women's Varsity Swimming team. She received All-American NCAA Division III accolades all her four years as an undergraduate.

== Honors and awards ==
- Member of the National Academy of Engineering, 2015
- Chair, 5th International Conference on Hot-Wire Chemical Vapor Deposition, 2008
- Guest Editor of Special Issue on CVD of Polymeric Materials in Chemical Vapor Deposition, 2008
- Donders Visiting Professorship Chair, Utrecht University, Netherlands, 2006
- Excellence Award for Research in Manufacturing and Environment, Safety and Health;sponsored by Semiconductor Research Corporation and International SEMATECH, 2000
- Tenth Annual Van Ness Award Lecturer, Rensselaer Polytechnic Institute, 2000
- Chair, Gordon Conference of Diamond Synthesis, Oxford UK, 1998
- All-American NCAA Division III Swimming, 1978–82
