= Heat of formation group additivity =

Heat of formation group additivity methods in thermochemistry enable the calculation and prediction of heat of formation of organic compounds based on additivity. This method was pioneered by S. W. Benson.

== Benson model ==
Starting with simple linear and branched alkanes and alkenes the method works by collecting a large number of experimental heat of formation data (see: Heat of Formation table) and then divide each molecule up into distinct groups each consisting of a central atom with multiple ligands:

X-(A)i(B)j(C)k(D)l

To each group is then assigned an empirical incremental value which is independent on its position inside the molecule and independent of the nature of its neighbors:

- P primary C-(C)(H)3 -10.00
- S secondary C-(C)2(H)2 -5.00
- T tertiary C-(C)3(H) -2.40
- Q quaternary C-(C)4 -0.10
- gauche correction +0.80
- 1,5 pentane interference correction +1.60

in kcal/mol and 298 K

The following example illustrates how these values can be derived.

The experimental heat of formation of ethane is -20.03 kcal/mol and ethane consists of 2 P groups. Likewise propane (-25.02 kcal/mol) can be written as 2P+S, isobutane (-32.07) as 3P+T and neopentane (-40.18 kcal/mol) as 4P+Q. These four equations and 4 unknowns work out to estimations for P (-10.01 kcal/mol), S (-4.99 kcal/mol), T (-2.03 kcal/mol) and Q (-0.12 kcal/mol). Of course the accuracy will increase when the dataset increases.

the data allow the calculation of heat of formation for isomers. For example, the pentanes:

- n-pentane = 2P + 3S = -35 (exp. -35 kcal/mol)
- isopentane = 3P + S + T + 1 gauche correction = -36.6 (exp. -36.7 kcal/mol)
- neopentane = 4P + Q = 40.1 (exp. 40.1 kcal/mol)

The group additivities for alkenes are:

- Cd-(H2) +6.27
- Cd-(C)(D) +8.55
- Cd-(C)2 +10.19
- Cd-(Cd)(H) +6.78
- Cd-(Cd)(C) +8.76
- C-(Cd)(H)3 -10.00
- C-(Cd)(C)(H)2 -4.80
- C-(Cd)(C)2(H) -1.67
- C-(Cd)(C)3 +1.77
- C-(Cd)2(H)2 -4.30
- cis correction +1.10
- alkene gauche correction +0.80

In alkenes the cis isomer is always less stable than the trans isomer by 1.10 kcal/mol.

More group additivity tables exist for a wide range of functional groups.

== Gronert model ==
An alternative model has been developed by S. Gronert based not on breaking molecules into fragments but based on 1,2 and 1,3 interactions

The Gronert equation reads: $\ \Delta H_f = -146.0*n_{C-C} -124.2*n_{C-H} - 66.2*n_{C=C} + 10.2*n_{C-C-C} + 9.3*n_{C-C-H} + 6.6*n_{H-C-H} + f(C,H)$

$\ f(C,H) = (231.3*n_{C} + 52.1*n_{H})$

The pentanes are now calculated as:

- n-pentane = 4CC + 12CH + 9HCH + 18HCC + 3CCC + (5C + 12H) = - 35.1 kcal/mol
- isopentane = 4CC + 12CH + 10HCH + 16HCC + 4CCC + (5C + 12H) = - 36.7 kcal/mol
- neopentane = 4CC + 12CH + 12HCH + 12HCC + 6CCC + (5C + 12H) = -40.1 kcal/mol

Key in this treatment is the introduction of 1,3-repulsive and destabilizing interactions and this type of steric hindrance should exist considering the molecular geometry of simple alkanes. In methane the distance between the hydrogen atoms is 1.8 angstrom but the combined van der Waals radii of hydrogen are 2.4 angstrom implying steric hindrance. Also in propane the methyl to methyl distance is 2.5 angstrom whereas the combined van der Waals radii are much larger (4 angstrom).

In the Gronert model these repulsive 1,3 interactions account for trends in bond dissociation energies which for example decrease going from methane to ethane to isopropane to neopentane. In this model the homolysis of a C-H bond releases strain energy in the alkane. In traditional bonding models the driving force is the ability of alkyl groups to donate electrons to the newly formed free radical carbon.

== See also ==
- Joback method
