= Lydersen method =

Thermodynamic model

The Lydersen method is a group contribution method for the estimation of critical properties temperature (T_{c}), pressure (P_{c}) and volume (V_{c}). The method is named after Aksel Lydersen who published it in 1955. The Lydersen method is the prototype for and ancestor of many new models like Joback, Klincewicz, Ambrose, Gani-Constantinou and others.

The Lydersen method is based in case of the critical temperature on the Guldberg rule which establishes a relation between the normal boiling point and the critical temperature.

== Equations ==
=== Critical temperature ===
$$T_c=\frac{T_b}{0.567+\sum G_i-\left(\sum G_i\right)^2}$$

Guldberg has found that a rough estimate of the normal boiling point T_{b}, when expressed in kelvins (i.e., as an absolute temperature), is approximately two-thirds of the critical temperature T_{c}. Lydersen uses this basic idea but calculates more accurate values.

=== Critical pressure ===
$$P_c=\frac{M}{\left(0.34+\sum G_i\right)^2}$$

=== Critical volume ===
$$V_c\,=\,40+\sum G_i$$

M is the molar mass and G_{i} are the group contributions (different for all three properties) for functional groups of a molecule.

== Group contributions ==
Group	G_{i} (T_{c})	G_{i} (P_{c})	G_{i} (V_{c})	Group	G_{i} (T_{c})	G_{i} (P_{c})	G_{i} (V_{c})
-CH3,-CH2-	0.020	0.227	55.0	>CH	0.012	0.210	51.0
-C<	-	0,210	41.0	=CH2,#CH	0.018	0,198	45.0
=C<,=C=	-	0.198	36.0	=C-H,#C-	0.005	0.153	36.0
-CH2-(Ring)	0.013	0.184	44.5	>CH-(Ring)	0.012	0.192	46.0
>C<(Ring)	-0.007	0.154	31.0	=CH-,=C<,=C=(Ring)	0.011	0.154	37.0
-F	0.018	0.224	18.0	-Cl	0.017	0.320	49.0
-Br	0.010	0.500	70.0	-I	0.012	0.830	95.0
-OH	0.082	0.060	18.0	-OH(Aromat)	0.031	-0.020	3.0
-O-	0.021	0.160	20.0	-O-(Ring)	0.014	0.120	8.0
>C=O	0.040	0.290	60.0	>C=O(Ring)	0.033	0.200	50.0
HC=O-	0.048	0.330	73.0	-COOH	0.085	0.400	80.0
-COO-	0.047	0.470	80.0	-NH2	0.031	0.095	28.0
>NH	0.031	0.135	37.0	>NH(Ring)	0.024	0.090	27.0
>N	0.014	0.170	42.0	>N-(Ring)	0.007	0.130	32.0
-CN	0.060	0.360	80.0	-NO2	0.055	0.420	78.0
-SH,-S-	0.015	0.270	55.0	-S-(Ring)	0.008	0.240	45.0
=S	0.003	0.240	47.0	>Si<	0.030	0.540	-
-B<	0.030	-	-

== Example calculation ==

Acetone is fragmented in two different groups, one carbonyl group and two methyl groups. For the critical volume the following calculation results:

V_{c} = 40 + 60.0 + 2 * 55.0 = 210 cm^{3}

In the literature (such as in the Dortmund Data Bank) the values 215.90 cm^{3}, 230.5 cm^{3} and 209.0 cm^{3} are published.
