= Critical point (thermodynamics) =

Temperature and pressure point where phase boundaries disappear

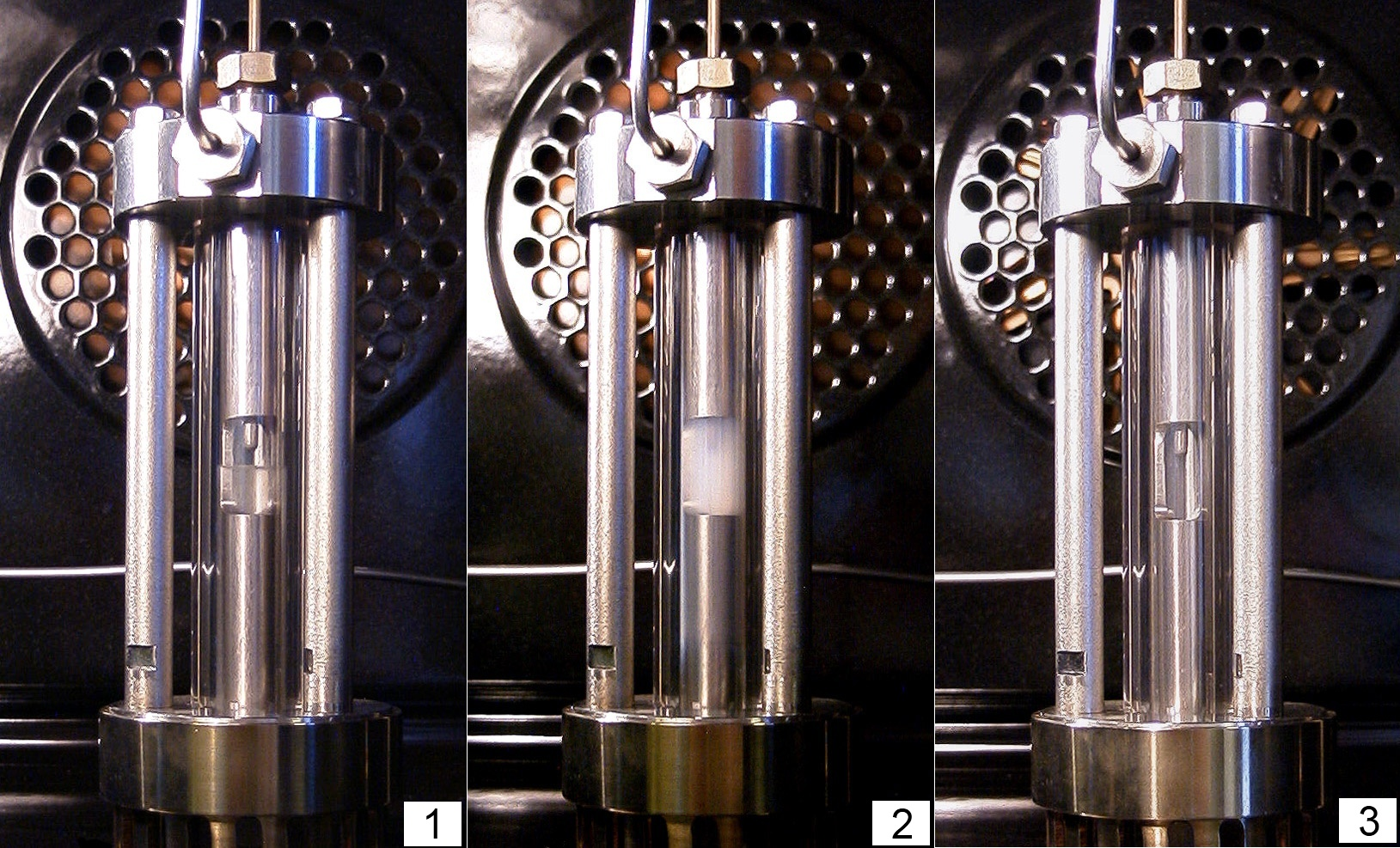
1. Subcritical ethane, liquid and gas phase coexist.; 2. Critical point (32.17 °C, 48.72 bar), displaying critical opalescence.; 3. Supercritical ethane, fluid.

In thermodynamics, a critical point (or critical state) is the end point of a phase equilibrium curve. One example is the liquid–vapor critical point, the end point of the pressure–temperature curve that designates conditions under which a liquid and its vapor can coexist. At higher temperatures, the gas comes into a supercritical phase, and so cannot be liquefied by pressure alone. At the critical point, defined by a critical temperature T_{c} and a critical pressure p_{c}, phase boundaries vanish. Other examples include the liquid–liquid critical points in mixtures, and the ferromagnet–paramagnet transition (Curie temperature) in the absence of an external magnetic field.

== Liquid–vapor critical point ==
=== Overview ===
The liquid–vapor critical point in a pressure–temperature phase diagram is at the high-temperature extreme of the liquid–gas phase boundary. The dashed green line shows the behavior of water, while the solid green line shows the behavior of most other substances.

The liquid–vapor critical point was the first critical point to be discovered, and it remains the best known and most studied one.

The figure shows the schematic P-T diagram of a pure substance (as opposed to mixtures, which have additional state variables and richer phase diagrams, discussed below). The commonly known phases solid, liquid and vapor are separated by phase boundaries, i.e. pressure–temperature combinations where two phases can coexist. At the triple point, all three phases can coexist. However, the liquid–vapor boundary terminates in an endpoint at some critical temperature T_{c} and critical pressure p_{c}. This is the critical point.

The critical point of water occurs at 647.096 K (373.946 °C; 705.103 °F) and 22.064 megapascals (3,200.1 psi; 217.75 atm; 220.64 bar).

In the vicinity of the critical point, the physical properties of the liquid and the vapor change dramatically, with both phases becoming even more similar. For instance, liquid water under normal conditions is nearly incompressible, has a low thermal expansion coefficient, has a high dielectric constant, and is an excellent solvent for electrolytes. Near the critical point, all these properties change into the exact opposite: water becomes compressible, expandable, a poor dielectric, a bad solvent for electrolytes, and mixes more readily with nonpolar gases and organic molecules.

At the critical point, only one phase exists. The heat of vaporization is zero. There is a stationary inflection point in the constant-temperature line (critical isotherm) on a PV diagram. This means that at the critical point:

$$\begin{align}
\left(\frac{\partial p}{\partial V}\right)_T &= 0\\
\left(\frac{\partial^2p}{\partial V^2}\right)_T &= 0
\end{align}$$

Isotherms of a gas. The red line is the critical isotherm, with critical point K. The dashed lines represent parts of isotherms which are forbidden since the gradient would be positive, giving the gas in this region a negative compressibility.

Above the critical point there exists a state of matter that is continuously connected with (can be transformed without phase transition into) both the liquid and the gaseous state. It is called supercritical fluid. The common textbook knowledge that all distinction between liquid and vapor disappears beyond the critical point has been challenged by Fisher and Widom, who identified a p–T line that separates states with different asymptotic statistical properties (Fisher–Widom line). Note that even at temperatures above the critical point temperature, sufficient pressure can still potentially compress the matter into a solid.

Sometimes the critical point does not manifest in most thermodynamic or mechanical properties, but is "hidden" and reveals itself in the onset of inhomogeneities in elastic moduli, marked changes in the appearance and local properties of non-affine droplets, and a sudden enhancement in defect pair concentration.

=== History ===
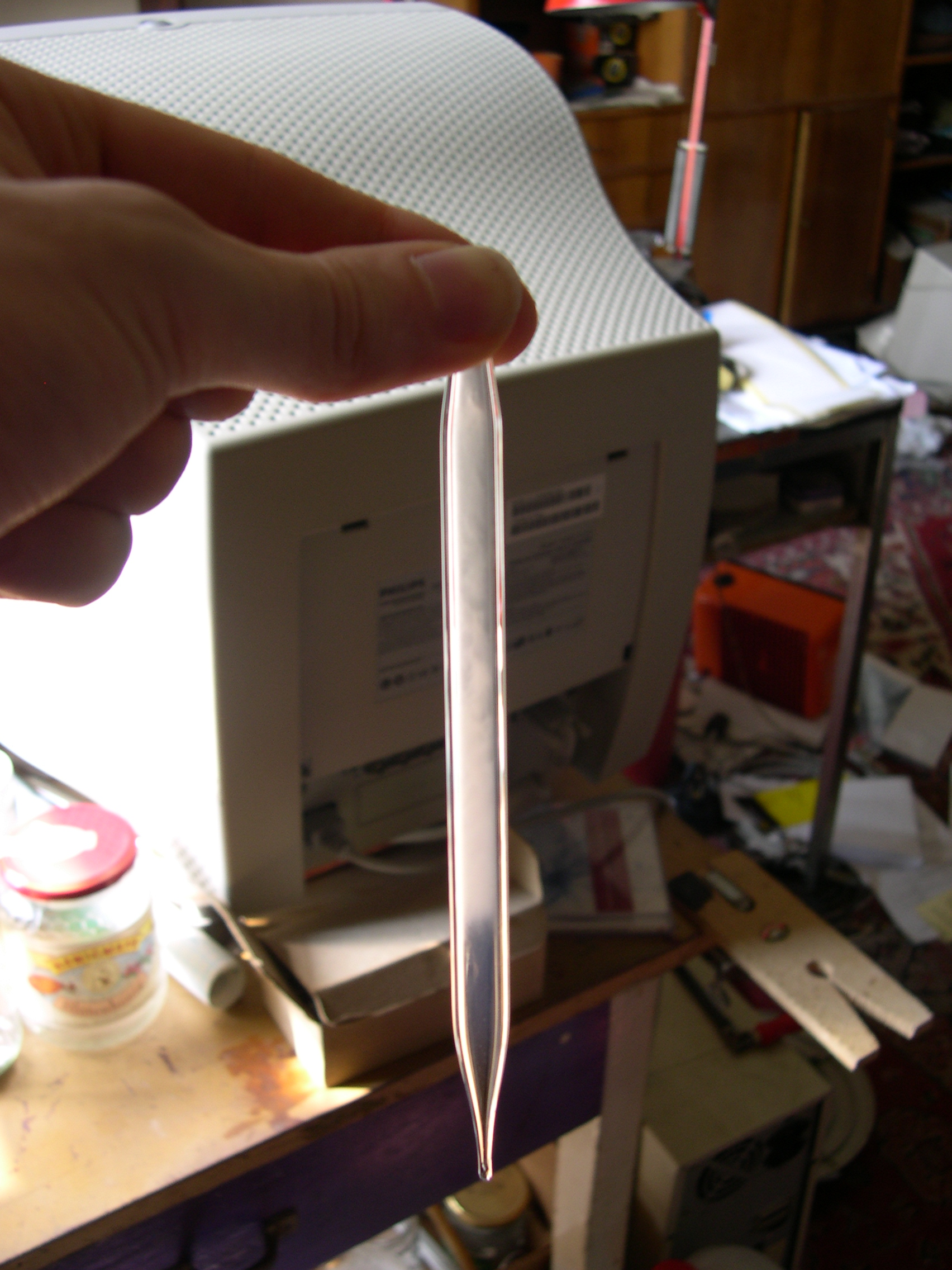
Critical carbon dioxide exuding fog while cooling from supercritical to critical temperature.

The existence of a critical point was first discovered by Charles Cagniard de la Tour in 1822 and named by Dmitri Mendeleev in 1860 and Thomas Andrews in 1869. Cagniard showed that CO_{2} could be liquefied at 31 °C at a pressure of 73 atm, but not at a slightly higher temperature, even under pressures as high as 3000 atm.

=== Theory ===
Solving the above condition $(\partial p / \partial V)_T = 0$ for the van der Waals equation, one can compute the critical point as

$$T_\text{c} = \frac{8a}{27Rb},
\quad V_\text{c} = 3nb,
\quad p_\text{c} = \frac{a}{27b^2}.$$

However, the van der Waals equation, based on a mean-field theory, does not hold near the critical point. In particular, it predicts wrong scaling laws.

To analyse properties of fluids near the critical point, reduced state variables are sometimes defined relative to the critical properties

$$T_\text{r} = \frac{T}{T_\text{c}},
\quad p_\text{r} = \frac{p}{p_\text{c}},
\quad V_\text{r} = \frac{V}{RT_\text{c} / p_\text{c}}.$$

The principle of corresponding states indicates that substances at equal reduced pressures and temperatures have equal reduced volumes. This relationship is approximately true for many substances, but becomes increasingly inaccurate for large values of p_{r}.

For some gases, there is an additional correction factor, called Newton's correction, added to the critical temperature and critical pressure calculated in this manner. These are empirically derived values and vary with the pressure range of interest.

=== Table of liquid–vapor critical temperature and pressure for selected substances ===
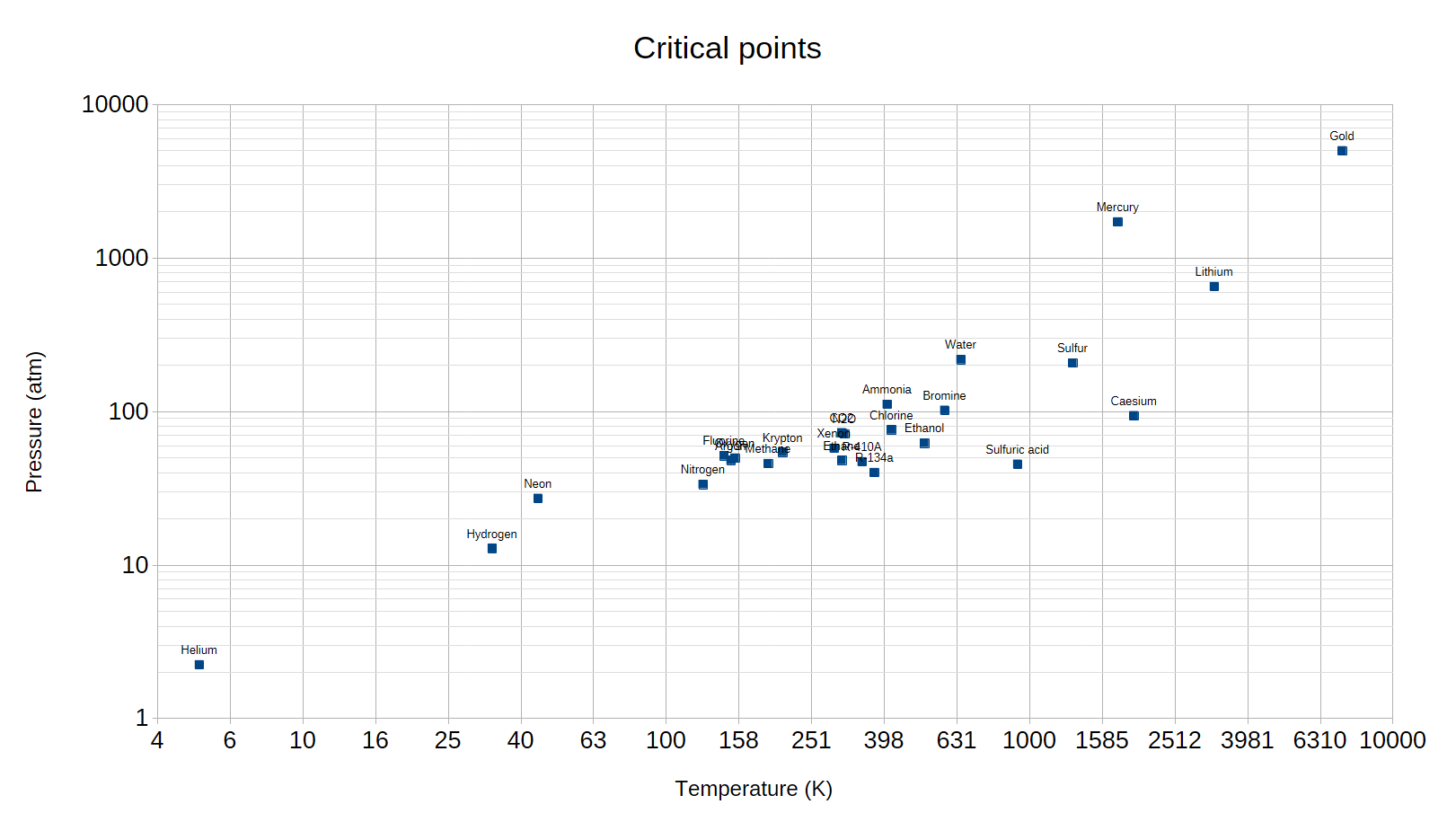
Critical points of several substances

Substance	Critical temperature	Critical pressure (absolute)
Argon	−122.4 °C (150.8 K)	48.1 atm (4,870 kPa)
Ammonia (NH_{3})	132.4 °C (405.5 K)	111.3 atm (11,280 kPa)
R-134a	101.06 °C (374.21 K)	40.06 atm (4,059 kPa)
R-410A	72.8 °C (345.9 K)	47.08 atm (4,770 kPa)
Bromine	310.8 °C (584.0 K)	102 atm (10,300 kPa)
Caesium	1,664.85 °C (1,938.00 K)	94 atm (9,500 kPa)
Chlorine	143.8 °C (416.9 K)	76.0 atm (7,700 kPa)
Ethane (C_{2}H_{6})	31.17 °C (304.32 K)	48.077 atm (4,871.4 kPa)
Ethanol (C_{2}H_{5}OH)	241 °C (514 K)	62.18 atm (6,300 kPa)
Fluorine	−128.85 °C (144.30 K)	51.5 atm (5,220 kPa)
Helium	−267.96 °C (5.19 K)	2.24 atm (227 kPa)
Hydrogen	−239.95 °C (33.20 K)	12.8 atm (1,300 kPa)
Krypton	−63.8 °C (209.3 K)	54.3 atm (5,500 kPa)
Methane (CH_{4})	−82.3 °C (190.8 K)	45.79 atm (4,640 kPa)
Neon	−228.75 °C (44.40 K)	27.2 atm (2,760 kPa)
Nitrogen	−146.9 °C (126.2 K)	33.5 atm (3,390 kPa)
Oxygen (O_{2})	−118.6 °C (154.6 K)	49.8 atm (5,050 kPa)
Carbon dioxide (CO_{2})	31.04 °C (304.19 K)	72.8 atm (7,380 kPa)
Nitrous oxide (N_{2}O)	36.4 °C (309.5 K)	71.5 atm (7,240 kPa)
Sulfuric acid (H_{2}SO_{4})	654 °C (927 K)	45.4 atm (4,600 kPa)
Xenon	16.6 °C (289.8 K)	57.6 atm (5,840 kPa)
Lithium	2,950 °C (3,220 K)	652 atm (66,100 kPa)
Mercury	1,476.9 °C (1,750.1 K)	1,720 atm (174,000 kPa)
Sulfur	1,040.85 °C (1,314.00 K)	207 atm (21,000 kPa)
Iron	8,227 °C (8,500 K)	
Gold	6,977 °C (7,250 K)	5,000 atm (510,000 kPa)
Aluminium	7,577 °C (7,850 K)	
Water (H_{2}O)	373.946 °C (647.096 K)	217.7 atm (22,060 kPa)

== Mixtures: liquid–liquid critical point ==
A plot of typical polymer solution phase behavior including two critical points: a LCST and an UCST

The liquid–liquid critical point of a solution, which occurs at the critical solution temperature, occurs at the limit of the two-phase region of the phase diagram. In other words, it is the point at which an infinitesimal change in some thermodynamic variable (such as temperature or pressure) leads to separation of the mixture into two distinct liquid phases, as shown in the polymer–solvent phase diagram to the right. Two types of liquid–liquid critical points are the upper critical solution temperature (UCST), which is the hottest point at which cooling induces phase separation, and the lower critical solution temperature (LCST), which is the coldest point at which heating induces phase separation.

=== Mathematical definition ===
From a theoretical standpoint, the liquid–liquid critical point represents the temperature–concentration extremum of the spinodal curve (as can be seen in the figure to the right). Thus, the liquid–liquid critical point in a two-component system must satisfy two conditions: the condition of the spinodal curve (the second derivative of the free energy with respect to concentration must equal zero), and the extremum condition (the third derivative of the free energy with respect to concentration must also equal zero or the derivative of the spinodal temperature with respect to concentration must equal zero).

== See also ==
- Conformal field theory
- Critical exponent
- Critical phenomena (more advanced article)
- Critical points of the elements (data page)
- Curie point
- Joback method, Klincewicz method, Lydersen method (estimation of critical temperature, pressure, and volume from molecular structure)
- Liquid–liquid critical point
- Lower critical solution temperature
- Néel point
- Percolation thresholds
- Phase transition
- Rushbrooke inequality
- Scale invariance
- Self-organized criticality
- Supercritical fluid, Supercritical drying, Supercritical water oxidation, Supercritical fluid extraction
- Tricritical point
- Triple point
- Upper critical solution temperature
- Widom scaling
