= Scheutjens–Fleer theory =

Scheutjens–Fleer theory is a lattice-based self-consistent field theory that is the basis for many computational analyses of polymer adsorption.
