= Joback method =

Thermodynamic model

The Joback method, often named Joback–Reid method, predicts eleven important and commonly used pure component thermodynamic properties from molecular structure only. It is named after Kevin G. Joback in 1984 and developed it further with Robert C. Reid. The Joback method is an extension of the Lydersen method and uses very similar groups, formulas, and parameters for the three properties the Lydersen already supported (critical temperature, critical pressure, critical volume).

Joback and Reid extended the range of supported properties, created new parameters and modified slightly the formulas of the old Lydersen method.

== Basic principles ==
=== Group-contribution method ===
Principle of a group-contribution method

The Joback method is a group-contribution method. These kinds of methods use basic structural information of a chemical molecule, like a list of simple functional groups, add parameters to these functional groups, and calculate thermophysical and transport properties as a function of the sum of group parameters.

Joback assumes that there are no interactions between the groups, and therefore only uses additive contributions and no contributions for interactions between groups. Other group-contribution methods, especially methods like UNIFAC, which estimate mixture properties like activity coefficients, use both simple additive group parameters and group-interaction parameters. The big advantage of using only simple group parameters is the small number of needed parameters. The number of needed group-interaction parameters gets very high for an increasing number of groups (1 for two groups, 3 for three groups, 6 for four groups, 45 for ten groups and twice as much if the interactions are not symmetric).

Nine of the properties are single temperature-independent values, mostly estimated by a simple sum of group contribution plus an addend. Two of the estimated properties are temperature-dependent: the ideal-gas heat capacity and the dynamic viscosity of liquids. The heat-capacity polynomial uses 4 parameters, and the viscosity equation only 2. In both cases the equation parameters are calculated by group contributions.

== Model strengths and weaknesses ==
=== Strengths ===
The popularity and success of the Joback method mainly originates from the single group list for all properties. This allows one to get all eleven supported properties from a single analysis of the molecular structure.

The Joback method additionally uses a very simple and easy to assign group scheme, which makes the method usable for people with only basic chemical knowledge.

=== Weaknesses ===
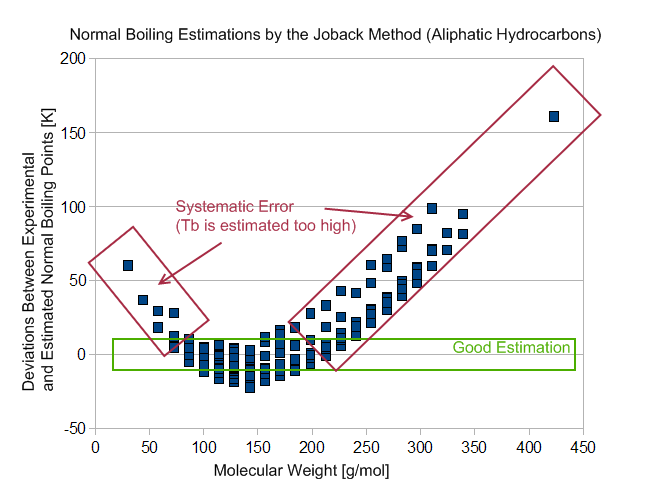
Systematic errors of the Joback method (normal boiling point)

Newer developments of estimation methods have shown that the quality of the Joback method is limited. The original authors already stated themselves in the original article abstract: "High accuracy is not claimed, but the proposed methods are often as or more accurate than techniques in common use today."

The list of groups does not cover many common molecules sufficiently. Especially aromatic compounds are not differentiated from normal ring-containing components. This is a severe problem because aromatic and aliphatic components differ strongly.

The data base Joback and Reid used for obtaining the group parameters was rather small and covered only a limited number of different molecules. The best coverage has been achieved for normal boiling points (438 components), and the worst for heats of fusion (155 components). Current developments that can use data banks, like the Dortmund Data Bank or the DIPPR data base, have a much broader coverage.

The formula used for the prediction of the normal boiling point shows another problem. Joback assumed a constant contribution of added groups in homologous series like the alkanes. This doesn't describe the real behavior of the normal boiling points correctly. Instead of the constant contribution, a decrease of the contribution with increasing number of groups must be applied. The chosen formula of the Joback method leads to high deviations for large and small molecules and an acceptable good estimation only for mid-sized components.

== Formulas ==
In the following formulas G_{i} denotes a group contribution. G_{i} are counted for every single available group. If a group is present multiple times, each occurrence is counted separately.

=== Normal boiling point ===
$T_\text{b}[\text{K}] = 198.2 + \sum T_{\text{b},i}.$

=== Melting point ===
$T_\text{m}[\text{K}] = 122.5 + \sum T_{\text{m},i}.$

=== Critical temperature ===
$T_\text{c}[\text{K}] = T_\text{b} \left[0.584 + 0.965 \sum T_{\text{c},i} - \left(\sum T_{\text{c},i}\right)^2 \right]^{-1}.$

This critical-temperature equation needs a normal boiling point T_{b}. If an experimental value is available, it is recommended to use this boiling point. It is, on the other hand, also possible to input the normal boiling point estimated by the Joback method. This will lead to a higher error.

=== Critical pressure ===
$P_\text{c}[\text{bar}] = \left [0.113 + 0.0032 \, N_\text{a} - \sum P_{\text{c},i}\right ]^{-2},$

where N_{a} is the number of atoms in the molecular structure (including hydrogens).

=== Critical volume ===
$V_\text{c}[\text{cm}^3/\text{mol}] = 17.5 + \sum V_{\text{c},i}.$

=== Heat of formation (ideal gas, 298 K) ===
$H_\text{formation}[\text{kJ}/\text{mol}] = 68.29 + \sum H_{\text{form},i}.$

=== Gibbs energy of formation (ideal gas, 298 K) ===
$G_\text{formation}[\text{kJ}/\text{mol}] = 53.88 + \sum G_{\text{form},i}.$

=== Heat capacity (ideal gas) ===
$C_P[\text{J}/(\text{mol}\cdot\text{K})] = \sum a_i - 37.93 + \left[ \sum b_i + 0.210 \right] T + \left[ \sum c_i - 3.91 \cdot 10^{-4} \right] T^2 + \left[\sum d_i + 2.06 \cdot 10^{-7}\right] T^3.$

The Joback method uses a four-parameter polynomial to describe the temperature dependency of the ideal-gas heat capacity. These parameters are valid from 273 K to about 1000 K. This can be extended to 1500K with some degree of uncertainty.

=== Heat of vaporization at normal boiling point ===
$\Delta H_\text{vap}[\text{kJ}/\text{mol}] = 15.30 + \sum H_{\text{vap},i}.$

=== Heat of fusion ===
$\Delta H_\text{fus}[\text{kJ}/\text{mol}] = -0.88 + \sum H_{\text{fus},i}.$

=== Liquid dynamic viscosity ===
$\eta_\text{L}[\text{Pa}\cdot\text{s}] = M_\text{w} exp{ \left[\left(\sum \eta_a - 597.82\right) / T + \sum \eta_b - 11.202\right] },$

where M_{w} is the molecular weight.

The method uses a two-parameter equation to describe the temperature dependency of the dynamic viscosity. The authors state that the parameters are valid from the melting temperature up to 0.7 of the critical temperature (T_{r} < 0.7).

== Group contributions ==
Group	T_{c}	P_{c}	V_{c}	T_{b}	T_{m}	H_{form}	G_{form}	a	b	c	d	H_{fusion}	H_{vap}	η_{a}	η_{b}
	Critical-state data			Temperatures of phase transitions		Chemical caloric properties		Ideal-gas heat capacities				Enthalpies of phase transitions		Dynamic viscosity	
Non-ring groups
−CH_{3}	0.0141	−0.0012	65	23.58	−5.10	−76.45	−43.96	1.95E+1	−8.08E−3	1.53E−4	−9.67E−8	0.908	2.373	548.29	−1.719
−CH_{2}−	0.0189	0.0000	56	22.88	11.27	−20.64	8.42	−9.09E−1	9.50E−2	−5.44E−5	1.19E−8	2.590	2.226	94.16	−0.199
>CH−	0.0164	0.0020	41	21.74	12.64	29.89	58.36	−2.30E+1	2.04E−1	−2.65E−4	1.20E−7	0.749	1.691	−322.15	1.187
>C<	0.0067	0.0043	27	18.25	46.43	82.23	116.02	−6.62E+1	4.27E−1	−6.41E−4	3.01E−7	−1.460	0.636	−573.56	2.307
=CH_{2}	0.0113	−0.0028	56	18.18	−4.32	−9.630	3.77	2.36E+1	−3.81E−2	1.72E−4	−1.03E−7	−0.473	1.724	495.01	−1.539
=CH−	0.0129	−0.0006	46	24.96	8.73	37.97	48.53	−8.00	1.05E−1	−9.63E−5	3.56E−8	2.691	2.205	82.28	−0.242
=C<	0.0117	0.0011	38	24.14	11.14	83.99	92.36	−2.81E+1	2.08E−1	−3.06E−4	1.46E−7	3.063	2.138	n. a.	n. a.
=C=	0.0026	0.0028	36	26.15	17.78	142.14	136.70	2.74E+1	−5.57E−2	1.01E−4	−5.02E−8	4.720	2.661	n. a.	n. a.
≡CH	0.0027	−0.0008	46	9.20	−11.18	79.30	77.71	2.45E+1	−2.71E−2	1.11E−4	−6.78E−8	2.322	1.155	n. a.	n. a.
≡C−	0.0020	0.0016	37	27.38	64.32	115.51	109.82	7.87	2.01E−2	−8.33E−6	1.39E-9	4.151	3.302	n. a.	n. a.
Ring groups
−CH_{2}−	0.0100	0.0025	48	27.15	7.75	−26.80	−3.68	−6.03	8.54E−2	−8.00E−6	−1.80E−8	0.490	2.398	307.53	−0.798
>CH−	0.0122	0.0004	38	21.78	19.88	8.67	40.99	−2.05E+1	1.62E−1	−1.60E−4	6.24E−8	3.243	1.942	−394.29	1.251
>C<	0.0042	0.0061	27	21.32	60.15	79.72	87.88	−9.09E+1	5.57E−1	−9.00E−4	4.69E−7	−1.373	0.644	n. a.	n. a.
=CH−	0.0082	0.0011	41	26.73	8.13	2.09	11.30	−2.14	5.74E−2	−1.64E−6	−1.59E−8	1.101	2.544	259.65	−0.702
=C<	0.0143	0.0008	32	31.01	37.02	46.43	54.05	−8.25	1.01E−1	−1.42E−4	6.78E−8	2.394	3.059	-245.74	0.912
Halogen groups
−F	0.0111	−0.0057	27	−0.03	−15.78	−251.92	−247.19	2.65E+1	−9.13E−2	1.91E−4	−1.03E−7	1.398	−0.670	n. a.	n. a.
−Cl	0.0105	−0.0049	58	38.13	13.55	−71.55	−64.31	3.33E+1	−9.63E−2	1.87E−4	−9.96E−8	2.515	4.532	625.45	−1.814
−Br	0.0133	0.0057	71	66.86	43.43	−29.48	−38.06	2.86E+1	−6.49E−2	1.36E−4	−7.45E−8	3.603	6.582	738.91	−2.038
−I	0.0068	−0.0034	97	93.84	41.69	21.06	5.74	3.21E+1	−6.41E−2	1.26E−4	−6.87E−8	2.724	9.520	809.55	−2.224
Oxygen groups
−OH (alcohol)	0.0741	0.0112	28	92.88	44.45	−208.04	−189.20	2.57E+1	−6.91E−2	1.77E−4	−9.88E−8	2.406	16.826	2173.72	−5.057
−OH (phenol)	0.0240	0.0184	−25	76.34	82.83	−221.65	−197.37	−2.81	1.11E−1	−1.16E−4	4.94E−8	4.490	12.499	3018.17	−7.314
−O− (non-ring)	0.0168	0.0015	18	22.42	22.23	−132.22	−105.00	2.55E+1	−6.32E−2	1.11E−4	−5.48E−8	1.188	2.410	122.09	−0.386
−O− (ring)	0.0098	0.0048	13	31.22	23.05	−138.16	−98.22	1.22E+1	−1.26E−2	6.03E−5	−3.86E−8	5.879	4.682	440.24	−0.953
>C=O (non-ring)	0.0380	0.0031	62	76.75	61.20	−133.22	−120.50	6.45	6.70E−2	−3.57E−5	2.86E−9	4.189	8.972	340.35	−0.350
>C=O (ring)	0.0284	0.0028	55	94.97	75.97	−164.50	−126.27	3.04E+1	−8.29E−2	2.36E−4	−1.31E−7	0.	6.645	n. a.	n. a.
O=CH− (aldehyde)	0.0379	0.0030	82	72.24	36.90	−162.03	−143.48	3.09E+1	−3.36E−2	1.60E−4	−9.88E−8	3.197	9.093	740.92	−1.713
−COOH (acid)	0.0791	0.0077	89	169.09	155.50	−426.72	−387.87	2.41E+1	4.27E−2	8.04E−5	−6.87E−8	11.051	19.537	1317.23	−2.578
−COO− (ester)	0.0481	0.0005	82	81.10	53.60	−337.92	−301.95	2.45E+1	4.02E−2	4.02E−5	−4.52E−8	6.959	9.633	483.88	−0.966
=O (other than above)	0.0143	0.0101	36	−10.50	2.08	−247.61	−250.83	6.82	1.96E−2	1.27E−5	−1.78E−8	3.624	5.909	675.24	−1.340
Nitrogen groups
−NH_{2}	0.0243	0.0109	38	73.23	66.89	−22.02	14.07	2.69E+1	−4.12E−2	1.64E−4	−9.76E−8	3.515	10.788	n. a.	n. a.
>NH (non-ring)	0.0295	0.0077	35	50.17	52.66	53.47	89.39	−1.21	7.62E−2	−4.86E−5	1.05E−8	5.099	6.436	n. a.	n. a.
>NH (ring)	0.0130	0.0114	29	52.82	101.51	31.65	75.61	1.18E+1	−2.30E−2	1.07E−4	−6.28E−8	7.490	6.930	n. a.	n. a.
>N− (non-ring)	0.0169	0.0074	9	11.74	48.84	123.34	163.16	−3.11E+1	2.27E−1	−3.20E−4	1.46E−7	4.703	1.896	n. a.	n. a.
−N= (non-ring)	0.0255	-0.0099	n. a.	74.60	n. a.	23.61	n. a.	n. a.	n. a.	n. a.	n. a.	n. a.	3.335	n. a.	n. a.
−N= (ring)	0.0085	0.0076	34	57.55	68.40	55.52	79.93	8.83	−3.84E-3	4.35E−5	−2.60E−8	3.649	6.528	n. a.	n. a.
=NH	n. a.	n. a.	n. a.	83.08	68.91	93.70	119.66	5.69	−4.12E−3	1.28E−4	−8.88E−8	n. a.	12.169	n. a.	n. a.
−CN	0.0496	−0.0101	91	125.66	59.89	88.43	89.22	3.65E+1	−7.33E−2	1.84E−4	−1.03E−7	2.414	12.851	n. a.	n. a.
−NO_{2}	0.0437	0.0064	91	152.54	127.24	−66.57	−16.83	2.59E+1	−3.74E−3	1.29E−4	−8.88E−8	9.679	16.738	n. a.	n. a.
Sulfur groups
−SH	0.0031	0.0084	63	63.56	20.09	−17.33	−22.99	3.53E+1	−7.58E−2	1.85E−4	−1.03E−7	2.360	6.884	n. a.	n. a.
−S− (non-ring)	0.0119	0.0049	54	68.78	34.40	41.87	33.12	1.96E+1	−5.61E−3	4.02E−5	−2.76E−8	4.130	6.817	n. a.	n. a.
−S− (ring)	0.0019	0.0051	38	52.10	79.93	39.10	27.76	1.67E+1	4.81E−3	2.77E−5	−2.11E−8	1.557	5.984	n. a.	n. a.

== Example calculation ==

Acetone (propanone) is the simplest ketone and is separated into three groups in the Joback method: two methyl groups (−CH_{3}) and one ketone group (C=O). Since the methyl group is present twice, its contributions have to be added twice.

	−CH_{3}		>C=O (non-ring)				
Property	No. of groups	Group value	No. of groups	Group value	$\sum G_i$	Estimated value	Unit
T_{c}	2	0.0141	1	0.0380	0.0662	500.5590	K
P_{c}	2	−1.20E−03	1	3.10E−03	7.00E−04	48.0250	bar
V_{c}	2	65.0000	1	62.0000	192.0000	209.5000	mL/mol
T_{b}	2	23.5800	1	76.7500	123.9100	322.1100	K
T_{m}	2	−5.1000	1	61.2000	51.0000	173.5000	K
H_{formation}	2	−76.4500	1	−133.2200	−286.1200	−217.8300	kJ/mol
G_{formation}	2	−43.9600	1	−120.5000	−208.4200	−154.5400	kJ/mol
C_{p}: a	2	1.95E+01	1	6.45E+00	4.55E+01		
C_{p}: b	2	−8.08E−03	1	6.70E−02	5.08E−02		
C_{p}: c	2	1.53E−04	1	−3.57E−05	2.70E−04		
C_{p}: d	2	−9.67E−08	1	2.86E−09	−1.91E−07		
C_{p}	at T = 300 K					75.3264	J/(mol·K)
H_{fusion}	2	0.9080	1	4.1890	6.0050	5.1250	kJ/mol
H_{vap}	2	2.3730	1	8.9720	13.7180	29.0180	kJ/mol
η_{a}	2	548.2900	1	340.3500	1436.9300		
η_{b}	2	−1.7190	1	−0.3500	−3.7880		
η	at T = 300 K					0.0002942	Pa·s
