= List of chemical elements =

118 chemical elements have been identified and named officially by IUPAC. A chemical element, often simply called an element, is a type of atom which has a specific number of protons in its atomic nucleus (i.e., a specific atomic number, or Z).

The definitive visualisation of all 118 elements is the periodic table of the elements, whose history along the principles of the periodic law was one of the founding developments of modern chemistry. It is a tabular arrangement of the elements by their chemical properties that usually uses abbreviated chemical symbols in place of full element names, but the linear list format presented here is also useful. Like the periodic table, the list below organizes the elements by the number of protons in their atoms; it can also be organized by other properties, such as atomic weight, density, and electronegativity. For more detailed information about the origins of element names, see List of chemical element name etymologies.

== List ==
List of chemical elements
Z	Sym.	Element	Name origin	Group	Period	Block	Atomic weight (Note: Standard atomic weight or A_{r}°(E): '1.0080': abridged value, uncertainty ignored here; '[97]', [ ] notation: mass number of most stable isotope) (Da)	Density (Note: Values in ( ) brackets are predictions) (Note: Density (sources)) (g/cm^{3})	Melting point (Note: Melting point in kelvin (K) (sources)) (K)	Boiling point (Note: Boiling point in kelvin (K) (sources)) (K)	Specific heat capacity (Note: Heat capacity (sources)) (J/(g · K))	Electro- negativity (Note: Electronegativity by Pauling (source))	Abundance in Earth's crust (Note: Abundance of elements in Earth's crust) (mg/kg)	Origin (Note: Primordial (=Earth's origin), from decay, or synthetic)	Phase (Note: Phase at Standard state (25°C [77°F], 100 kPa))
1	H	Hydrogen	(Note: Greek roots hydro- + -gen, 'water-forming')	1	1	s-block	1.0080	0.00008988	14.01	20.28	14.304	2.20	1400	primordial	gas
2	He	Helium	(Note: Greek hḗlios 'sun')	18	1	s-block	4.0026	0.0001785	– (Note: Melting point: helium does not solidify at a pressure of 1 atmosphere. Helium can only solidify at pressures above 25 atm.)	4.22	5.193	–	0.008	primordial	gas
3	Li	Lithium	(Note: Greek líthos 'stone')	1	2	s-block	6.94	0.534	453.69	1560	3.582	0.98	20	primordial	solid
4	Be	Beryllium	(Note: Beryl, mineral (ultimately after Belur, Karnataka, India?))	2	2	s-block	9.0122	1.85	1560	2742	1.825	1.57	2.8	primordial	solid
5	B	Boron	(Note: Borax, mineral (from Arabic: bawraq, Middle Persian: *bōrag))	13	2	p-block	10.81	2.34	2349	4200	1.026	2.04	10	primordial	solid
6	C	Carbon	(Note: Latin carbo 'coal')	14	2	p-block	12.011	2.267	>4000	4300	0.709	2.55	200	primordial	solid
7	N	Nitrogen	(Note: Greek nítron + -gen, 'niter-forming')	15	2	p-block	14.007	0.0012506	63.15	77.36	1.04	3.04	19	primordial	gas
8	O	Oxygen	(Note: Greek oxy- + -gen, 'acid-forming')	16	2	p-block	15.999	0.001429	54.36	90.20	0.918	3.44	461000	primordial	gas
9	F	Fluorine	(Note: Latin fluo 'to flow')	17	2	p-block	18.998	0.001696	53.53	85.03	0.824	3.98	585	primordial	gas
10	Ne	Neon	(Note: Greek néon 'new')	18	2	p-block	20.180	0.0009002	24.56	27.07	1.03	–	0.005	primordial	gas
11	Na	Sodium	(Note: Coined by Humphry Davy who first isolated it, from English soda (specifically caustic soda), via Italian from Arabic ṣudāʕ 'headache')	1	3	s-block	22.990	0.968	370.87	1156	1.228	0.93	23600	primordial	solid
12	Mg	Magnesium	(Note: Magnesia region, eastern Thessaly, Greece)	2	3	s-block	24.305	1.738	923	1363	1.023	1.31	23300	primordial	solid
13	Al	Aluminium	(Note: Alumina, from Latin alumen (gen. aluminis) 'bitter salt, alum')	13	3	p-block	26.982	2.70	933.47	2792	0.897	1.61	82300	primordial	solid
14	Si	Silicon	(Note: Latin silex 'flint' (originally silicium))	14	3	p-block	28.085	2.3290	1687	3538	0.705	1.9	282000	primordial	solid
15	P	Phosphorus	(Note: Greek phōsphóros 'light-bearing')	15	3	p-block	30.974	1.823	317.30	550	0.769	2.19	1050	primordial	solid
16	S	Sulfur	(Note: Latin)	16	3	p-block	32.06	2.07	388.36	717.87	0.71	2.58	350	primordial	solid
17	Cl	Chlorine	(Note: Greek chlōrós 'greenish yellow')	17	3	p-block	35.45	0.0032	171.6	239.11	0.479	3.16	145	primordial	gas
18	Ar	Argon	(Note: Greek argós 'idle' (it is inert))	18	3	p-block	39.95	0.001784	83.80	87.30	0.52	–	3.5	primordial	gas
19	K	Potassium	(Note: Neo-Latin potassa 'potash', from pot + ash)	1	4	s-block	39.098	0.89	336.53	1032	0.757	0.82	20900	primordial	solid
20	Ca	Calcium	(Note: Latin calx 'lime')	2	4	s-block	40.078	1.55	1115	1757	0.647	1.00	41500	primordial	solid
21	Sc	Scandium	(Note: Latin Scandia 'Scandinavia')	3	4	d-block	44.956	2.985	1814	3109	0.568	1.36	22	primordial	solid
22	Ti	Titanium	(Note: Titans, children of Gaia and Ouranos)	4	4	d-block	47.867	4.506	1941	3560	0.523	1.54	5650	primordial	solid
23	V	Vanadium	(Note: Vanadis, a name for Norse goddess Freyja)	5	4	d-block	50.942	6.11	2183	3680	0.489	1.63	120	primordial	solid
24	Cr	Chromium	(Note: Greek chróma 'colour')	6	4	d-block	51.996	7.15	2180	2944	0.449	1.66	102	primordial	solid
25	Mn	Manganese	(Note: Corrupted from magnesia negra; see magnesium)	7	4	d-block	54.938	7.21	1519	2334	0.479	1.55	950	primordial	solid
26	Fe	Iron	(Note: English, from Proto-Celtic *īsarnom 'iron', from a root meaning 'blood')	8	4	d-block	55.845	7.874	1811	3134	0.449	1.83	56300	primordial	solid
27	Co	Cobalt	(Note: German Kobold, 'goblin')	9	4	d-block	58.933	8.90	1768	3200	0.421	1.88	25	primordial	solid
28	Ni	Nickel	(Note: Nickel, a mischievous sprite in German miner mythology)	10	4	d-block	58.693	8.908	1728	3186	0.444	1.91	84	primordial	solid
29	Cu	Copper	(Note: English, from Latin cuprum, after Cyprus)	11	4	d-block	63.546	8.96	1357.77	2835	0.385	1.90	60	primordial	solid
30	Zn	Zinc	(Note: Most likely German Zinke, 'prong, tooth', but some suggest Persian sang 'stone')	12	4	d-block	65.38	7.14	692.88	1180	0.388	1.65	70	primordial	solid
31	Ga	Gallium	(Note: Latin Gallia 'France')	13	4	p-block	69.723	5.91	302.9146	2673	0.371	1.81	19	primordial	solid
32	Ge	Germanium	(Note: Latin Germania 'Germany')	14	4	p-block	72.630	5.323	1211.40	3106	0.32	2.01	1.5	primordial	solid
33	As	Arsenic	(Note: Middle English, from Middle French arsenic, from Greek arsenikón 'yellow arsenic' (influenced by arsenikós 'masculine, virile'), from a West Asian wanderword ultimately from Old Persian: *zarniya-ka, lit. 'golden')	15	4	p-block	74.922	5.727	1090 (Note: Arsenic sublimes at 1 atmosphere pressure.)	887	0.329	2.18	1.8	primordial	solid
34	Se	Selenium	(Note: Greek selḗnē 'moon')	16	4	p-block	78.971	4.81	453	958	0.321	2.55	0.05	primordial	solid
35	Br	Bromine	(Note: Greek brômos 'stench')	17	4	p-block	79.904	3.1028	265.8	332.0	0.474	2.96	2.4	primordial	liquid
36	Kr	Krypton	(Note: Greek kryptós 'hidden')	18	4	p-block	83.798	0.003749	115.79	119.93	0.248	3.00	1×10^{−4}	primordial	gas
37	Rb	Rubidium	(Note: Latin rubidus 'deep red')	1	5	s-block	85.468	1.532	312.46	961	0.363	0.82	90	primordial	solid
38	Sr	Strontium	(Note: Strontian, a village in Scotland, where it was found)	2	5	s-block	87.62	2.64	1050	1655	0.301	0.95	370	primordial	solid
39	Y	Yttrium	(Note: Ytterby, Sweden, where it was found; see terbium, erbium, ytterbium)	3	5	d-block	88.906	4.472	1799	3609	0.298	1.22	33	primordial	solid
40	Zr	Zirconium	(Note: Zircon, mineral, from Persian zargun 'gold-hued')	4	5	d-block	91.224	6.52	2128	4682	0.278	1.33	165	primordial	solid
41	Nb	Niobium	(Note: Niobe, daughter of king Tantalus in Greek myth; see tantalum)	5	5	d-block	92.906	8.57	2750	5017	0.265	1.6	20	primordial	solid
42	Mo	Molybdenum	(Note: Greek molýbdaina 'piece of lead', from mólybdos 'lead', due to confusion with lead ore galena (PbS))	6	5	d-block	95.95	10.28	2896	4912	0.251	2.16	1.2	primordial	solid
43	Tc	Technetium	(Note: Greek tekhnētós 'artificial')	7	5	d-block	[97]	11	2430	4538	–	1.9	~ 3×10^{−9}	from decay	solid
44	Ru	Ruthenium	(Note: Neo-Latin Ruthenia 'Russia')	8	5	d-block	101.07	12.45	2607	4423	0.238	2.2	0.001	primordial	solid
45	Rh	Rhodium	(Note: Greek rhodóeis 'rose-coloured', from rhódon 'rose')	9	5	d-block	102.91	12.41	2237	3968	0.243	2.28	0.001	primordial	solid
46	Pd	Palladium	(Note: Pallas, asteroid, then considered a planet)	10	5	d-block	106.42	12.023	1828.05	3236	0.244	2.20	0.015	primordial	solid
47	Ag	Silver	(Note: English, from Proto-Germanic)	11	5	d-block	107.87	10.49	1234.93	2435	0.235	1.93	0.075	primordial	solid
48	Cd	Cadmium	(Note: Neo-Latin cadmia 'calamine', from King Cadmus, mythic founder of Thebes)	12	5	d-block	112.41	8.65	594.22	1040	0.232	1.69	0.159	primordial	solid
49	In	Indium	(Note: Latin indicum 'indigo', the blue dye named after India and its color observed in indium's spectral lines)	13	5	p-block	114.82	7.31	429.75	2345	0.233	1.78	0.25	primordial	solid
50	Sn	Tin	(Note: English, from Proto-Germanic)	14	5	p-block	118.71	7.265	505.08	2875	0.228	1.96	2.3	primordial	solid
51	Sb	Antimony	(Note: Latin antimonium, of unclear origin: folk etymologies suggest Greek antí 'against' + mónos 'alone', or Old French anti-moine 'monk's bane', but could be from or related to Arabic ʾiṯmid 'antimony')	15	5	p-block	121.76	6.697	903.78	1860	0.207	2.05	0.2	primordial	solid
52	Te	Tellurium	(Note: Latin tellus 'ground, earth')	16	5	p-block	127.60	6.24	722.66	1261	0.202	2.1	0.001	primordial	solid
53	I	Iodine	(Note: French iode, from Greek ioeidḗs 'violet')	17	5	p-block	126.90	4.933	386.85	457.4	0.214	2.66	0.45	primordial	solid
54	Xe	Xenon	(Note: Greek xénon, neuter of xénos 'strange, foreign')	18	5	p-block	131.29	0.005894	161.4	165.03	0.158	2.60	3×10^{−5}	primordial	gas
55	Cs	Caesium	(Note: Latin caesius 'sky-blue')	1	6	s-block	132.91	1.93	301.59	944	0.242	0.79	3	primordial	solid
56	Ba	Barium	(Note: Greek barýs 'heavy')	2	6	s-block	137.33	3.51	1000	2170	0.204	0.89	425	primordial	solid
57	La	Lanthanum	(Note: Greek lanthánein 'to lie hidden')	f-block groups	6	f-block	138.91	6.162	1193	3737	0.195	1.1	39	primordial	solid
58	Ce	Cerium	(Note: Ceres (dwarf planet), then considered a planet)	f-block groups	6	f-block	140.12	6.770	1068	3716	0.192	1.12	66.5	primordial	solid
59	Pr	Praseodymium	(Note: Greek prásios dídymos 'green twin')	f-block groups	6	f-block	140.91	6.77	1208	3793	0.193	1.13	9.2	primordial	solid
60	Nd	Neodymium	(Note: Greek néos dídymos 'new twin')	f-block groups	6	f-block	144.24	7.01	1297	3347	0.19	1.14	41.5	primordial	solid
61	Pm	Promethium	(Note: Prometheus, a Titan)	f-block groups	6	f-block	[145]	7.26	1315	3273	–	1.13	2×10^{−19}	from decay	solid
62	Sm	Samarium	(Note: Samarskite, a mineral named after V. Samarsky-Bykhovets, Russian mine official)	f-block groups	6	f-block	150.36	7.52	1345	2067	0.197	1.17	7.05	primordial	solid
63	Eu	Europium	(Note: Europe)	f-block groups	6	f-block	151.96	5.244	1099	1802	0.182	1.2	2	primordial	solid
64	Gd	Gadolinium	(Note: Gadolinite, a mineral named after Johan Gadolin, Finnish chemist, physicist and mineralogist)	f-block groups	6	f-block	157.25	7.90	1585	3546	0.236	1.2	6.2	primordial	solid
65	Tb	Terbium	(Note: Ytterby, Sweden, where it was found; see yttrium, erbium, ytterbium)	f-block groups	6	f-block	158.93	8.23	1629	3503	0.182	1.2	1.2	primordial	solid
66	Dy	Dysprosium	(Note: Greek dysprósitos 'hard to get')	f-block groups	6	f-block	162.50	8.540	1680	2840	0.17	1.22	5.2	primordial	solid
67	Ho	Holmium	(Note: Neo-Latin Holmia 'Stockholm')	f-block groups	6	f-block	164.93	8.79	1734	2993	0.165	1.23	1.3	primordial	solid
68	Er	Erbium	(Note: Ytterby, where it was found; see yttrium, terbium, ytterbium)	f-block groups	6	f-block	167.26	9.066	1802	3141	0.168	1.24	3.5	primordial	solid
69	Tm	Thulium	(Note: Thule, the ancient name for an unclear northern location)	f-block groups	6	f-block	168.93	9.32	1818	2223	0.16	1.25	0.52	primordial	solid
70	Yb	Ytterbium	(Note: Ytterby, where it was found; see yttrium, terbium, erbium)	f-block groups	6	f-block	173.05	6.90	1097	1469	0.155	1.1	3.2	primordial	solid
71	Lu	Lutetium	(Note: Latin Lutetia 'Paris')	3	6	d-block	174.97	9.841	1925	3675	0.154	1.27	0.8	primordial	solid
72	Hf	Hafnium	(Note: Neo-Latin Hafnia 'Copenhagen' (from Danish havn, harbor))	4	6	d-block	178.49	13.31	2506	4876	0.144	1.3	3	primordial	solid
73	Ta	Tantalum	(Note: King Tantalus, father of Niobe in Greek myth; see niobium)	5	6	d-block	180.95	16.69	3290	5731	0.14	1.5	2	primordial	solid
74	W	Tungsten	(Note: Swedish tung sten 'heavy stone')	6	6	d-block	183.84	19.25	3695	6203	0.132	2.36	1.3	primordial	solid
75	Re	Rhenium	(Note: Latin Rhenus 'Rhine')	7	6	d-block	186.21	21.02	3459	5869	0.137	1.9	7×10^{−4}	primordial	solid
76	Os	Osmium	(Note: Greek osmḗ 'smell')	8	6	d-block	190.23	22.59	3306	5285	0.13	2.2	0.002	primordial	solid
77	Ir	Iridium	(Note: Iris, Greek goddess of rainbow)	9	6	d-block	192.22	22.56	2719	4701	0.131	2.20	0.001	primordial	solid
78	Pt	Platinum	(Note: Spanish platina 'little silver', from plata 'silver')	10	6	d-block	195.08	21.45	2041.4	4098	0.133	2.28	0.005	primordial	solid
79	Au	Gold	(Note: English, from same Proto-Indo-European root as 'yellow')	11	6	d-block	196.97	19.3	1337.33	3129	0.129	2.54	0.004	primordial	solid
80	Hg	Mercury	(Note: Mercury, Roman god of commerce, communication, and luck, known for his speed and mobility)	12	6	d-block	200.59	13.534	234.43	629.88	0.14	2.00	0.085	primordial	liquid
81	Tl	Thallium	(Note: Greek thallós 'green shoot / twig')	13	6	p-block	204.38	11.85	577	1746	0.129	1.62	0.85	primordial	solid
82	Pb	Lead	(Note: English, from Proto-Celtic *ɸloudom, from a root meaning 'flow')	14	6	p-block	207.2	11.34	600.61	2022	0.129	1.87 (2+); 2.33 (4+)	14	primordial	solid
83	Bi	Bismuth	(Note: German Wismut, via Latin and Arabic from Greek psimúthion 'white lead')	15	6	p-block	208.98	9.78	544.7	1837	0.122	2.02	0.009	primordial	solid
84	Po	Polonium	(Note: Latin Polonia 'Poland', home country of discoverer Marie Curie)	16	6	p-block	[209]	9.196	527	1235	–	2.0	2×10^{−10}	from decay	solid
85	At	Astatine	(Note: Greek ástatos 'unstable'; it has no stable isotopes)	17	6	p-block	[210]	(8.91–8.95)	575	610	–	2.2	3×10^{−20}	from decay	unknown phase
86	Rn	Radon	(Note: Radium emanation, originally the name of ^{222}Rn)	18	6	p-block	[222]	0.00973	202	211.3	0.094	2.2	4×10^{−13}	from decay	gas
87	Fr	Francium	(Note: France, home country of discoverer Marguerite Perey)	1	7	s-block	[223]	(2.48)	281	890	–	>0.79	~ 1×10^{−18}	from decay	unknown phase
88	Ra	Radium	(Note: Coined in French by discoverer Marie Curie, from Latin radius 'ray')	2	7	s-block	[226]	5.5	973	2010	0.094	0.9	9×10^{−7}	from decay	solid
89	Ac	Actinium	(Note: Greek aktís 'ray')	f-block groups	7	f-block	[227]	10	1323	3471	0.12	1.1	5.5×10^{−10}	from decay	solid
90	Th	Thorium	(Note: Thor, the Norse god of thunder)	f-block groups	7	f-block	232.04	11.7	2115	5061	0.113	1.3	9.6	primordial	solid
91	Pa	Protactinium	(Note: English prefix proto- (from Greek prôtos 'first, before') + actinium; protactinium decays into actinium.)	f-block groups	7	f-block	231.04	15.37	1841	4300	–	1.5	1.4×10^{−6}	from decay	solid
92	U	Uranium	(Note: Uranus, the seventh planet)	f-block groups	7	f-block	238.03	19.1	1405.3	4404	0.116	1.38	2.7	primordial	solid
93	Np	Neptunium	(Note: Neptune, the eighth planet)	f-block groups	7	f-block	[237]	20.45	917	4273	–	1.36	≤ 3×10^{−12}	from decay	solid
94	Pu	Plutonium	(Note: Pluto, dwarf planet, then considered a planet)	f-block groups	7	f-block	[244]	19.85	912.5	3501	–	1.28	≤ 3×10^{−11}	from decay	solid
95	Am	Americium	(Note: Americas, where the element was first synthesized, by analogy with its homolog europium)	f-block groups	7	f-block	[243]	12	1449	2880	–	1.13	–	synthetic	solid
96	Cm	Curium	(Note: Pierre and Marie Curie, physicists and chemists)	f-block groups	7	f-block	[247]	13.51	1613	3383	–	1.28	–	synthetic	solid
97	Bk	Berkelium	(Note: Berkeley, California, where it was first synthesized)	f-block groups	7	f-block	[247]	14.78	1259	2900	–	1.3	–	synthetic	solid
98	Cf	Californium	(Note: California, where it was first synthesized in LBNL)	f-block groups	7	f-block	[251]	15.1	1173	(1743)	–	1.3	–	synthetic	solid
99	Es	Einsteinium	(Note: Albert Einstein, German physicist)	f-block groups	7	f-block	[252]	8.84	1133	(1269)	–	1.3	–	synthetic	solid
100	Fm	Fermium	(Note: Enrico Fermi, Italian physicist)	f-block groups	7	f-block	[257]	(9.7)	(1125) (1800)	–	–	1.3	–	synthetic	unknown phase
101	Md	Mendelevium	(Note: Dmitri Mendeleev, Russian chemist who proposed the periodic table)	f-block groups	7	f-block	[258]	(10.3)	(1100)	–	–	1.3	–	synthetic	unknown phase
102	No	Nobelium	(Note: Alfred Nobel, Swedish chemist and engineer)	f-block groups	7	f-block	[259]	(9.9)	(1100)	–	–	1.3	–	synthetic	unknown phase
103	Lr	Lawrencium	(Note: Ernest Lawrence, American physicist)	3	7	d-block	[266]	(14.4)	(1900)	–	–	1.3	–	synthetic	unknown phase
104	Rf	Rutherfordium	(Note: Ernest Rutherford, chemist and physicist from New Zealand)	4	7	d-block	[267]	(17)	(2400)	(5800)	–	–	–	synthetic	unknown phase
105	Db	Dubnium	(Note: Dubna, Russia, where it was discovered in JINR)	5	7	d-block	[268]	(21.6)	–	–	–	–	–	synthetic	unknown phase
106	Sg	Seaborgium	(Note: Glenn Seaborg, American chemist)	6	7	d-block	[267]	(23–24)	–	–	–	–	–	synthetic	unknown phase
107	Bh	Bohrium	(Note: Niels Bohr, Danish physicist)	7	7	d-block	[270]	(26–27)	–	–	–	–	–	synthetic	unknown phase
108	Hs	Hassium	(Note: Neo-Latin Hassia 'Hesse', a state in Germany)	8	7	d-block	[271]	(27–29)	–	–	–	–	–	synthetic	unknown phase
109	Mt	Meitnerium	(Note: Lise Meitner, Austrian physicist)	9	7	d-block	[278]	(27–28)	–	–	–	–	–	synthetic	unknown phase
110	Ds	Darmstadtium	(Note: Darmstadt, Germany, where it was first synthesized in the GSI labs)	10	7	d-block	[281]	(26–27)	–	–	–	–	–	synthetic	unknown phase
111	Rg	Roentgenium	(Note: Wilhelm Röntgen, German physicist)	11	7	d-block	[282]	(22–24)	–	–	–	–	–	synthetic	unknown phase
112	Cn	Copernicium	(Note: Nicolaus Copernicus, Polish astronomer)	12	7	d-block	[285]	(14.0)	(283±11)	(340±10)	–	–	–	synthetic	unknown phase
113	Nh	Nihonium	(Note: Japanese Nihon 'Japan', where it was first synthesized in Riken)	13	7	p-block	[286]	(16)	(700)	(1400)	–	–	–	synthetic	unknown phase
114	Fl	Flerovium	(Note: Flerov Laboratory of Nuclear Reactions, part of JINR, where it was synthesized; itself named after Georgy Flyorov, Russian physicist)	14	7	p-block	[289]	(11.4±0.3)	(284±50)	–	–	–	–	synthetic	unknown phase
115	Mc	Moscovium	(Note: Moscow, Russia, where it was first synthesized in JINR)	15	7	p-block	[290]	(13.5)	(700)	(1400)	–	–	–	synthetic	unknown phase
116	Lv	Livermorium	(Note: Lawrence Livermore National Laboratory in Livermore, California)	16	7	p-block	[293]	(12.9)	(700)	(1100)	–	–	–	synthetic	unknown phase
117	Ts	Tennessine	(Note: Tennessee, US, home to ORNL)	17	7	p-block	[294]	(7.1–7.3)	(700)	(883)	–	–	–	synthetic	unknown phase
118	Og	Oganesson	(Note: Yuri Oganessian, Russian physicist)	18	7	p-block	[294]	(7)	(325±15)	(450±10)	–	–	–	synthetic	unknown phase

== See also ==
- List of chemical elements named after people
- List of chemical elements named after places
- List of chemical element name etymologies
- Roles of chemical elements
- Extended periodic table — Periodic table with eight or more periods
