= Chemical element =

Chemical substance not composed of simpler ones

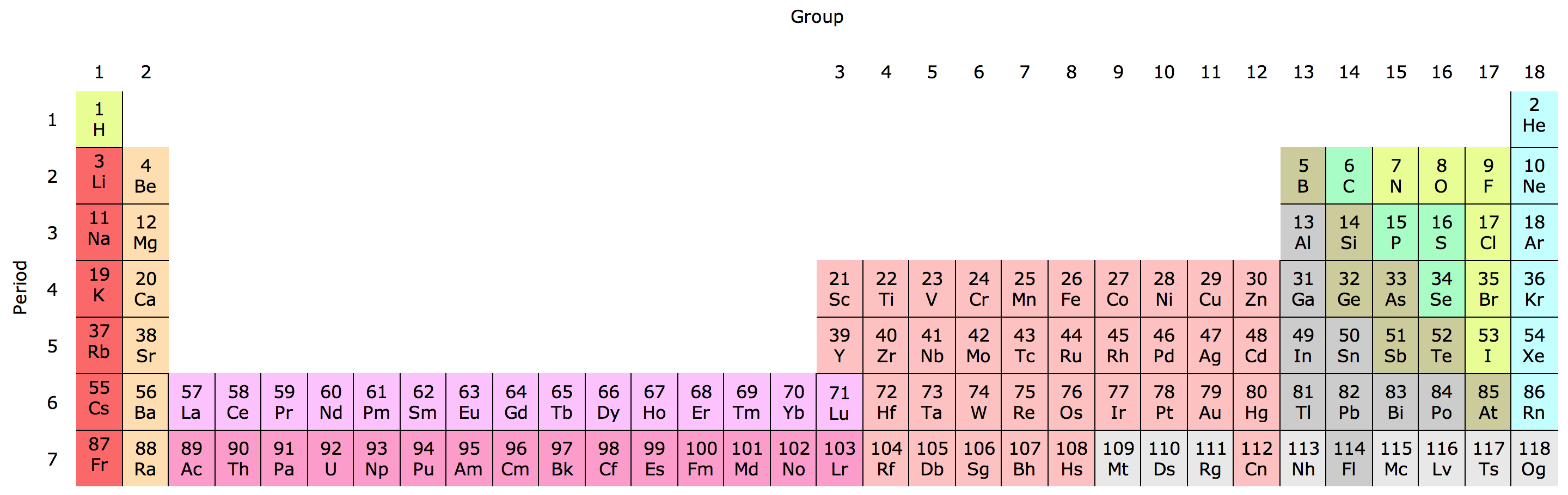
The chemical elements ordered in the periodic table, as shown in the 32-column format

A chemical element is a species of atom defined by its number of protons. The number of protons is called the atomic number of that element. For example, oxygen has an atomic number of 8: each oxygen atom has 8 protons in its nucleus. Atoms of the same element can have different numbers of neutrons in their nuclei, known as isotopes of the element. Atoms of one element can be transformed into atoms of a different element in nuclear reactions, which change an atom's atomic number. Almost all baryonic matter in the universe is composed of elements (among rare exceptions are neutron stars).

The term "chemical element" is also widely used to mean a pure chemical substance consisting of a single element. For example, oxygen gas consists only of atoms of oxygen.

Historically, the term "chemical element" meant a substance that cannot be broken down into constituent substances by chemical reactions, and for most practical purposes this definition still has validity. There was some controversy in the 1920s over whether isotopes deserved to be recognised as separate elements if they could be separated by chemical means. By November 2016, the International Union of Pure and Applied Chemistry (IUPAC) recognized a total of 118 elements. The first 94 occur naturally on Earth, and the remaining 24 are synthetic elements produced in nuclear reactions. Save for unstable radioactive elements (radioelements) which decay quickly, nearly all elements are available industrially in varying amounts. The discovery and synthesis of further new elements is an ongoing area of scientific study.

The history of the discovery and use of elements began with early human societies that discovered native minerals such as carbon, sulfur, copper, and gold (though the modern concept of an element was not yet understood). Attempts to classify materials such as these resulted in the concepts of classical elements, alchemy, and similar theories throughout history. Much of the modern understanding of elements developed from the work of Dmitri Mendeleev, a Russian chemist who published the first recognizable periodic table in 1869. This table organizes the elements by increasing atomic number into rows ("periods") in which the columns ("groups") share recurring ("periodic") physical and chemical properties. The periodic table summarizes various properties of the elements, allowing chemists to derive relationships between them and to make predictions about exceedingly transient nuclides not yet observed, and the potential compounds these unknown elements might form.

== Description ==
The term "(chemical) element" is used in two different but closely related meanings: it can mean a chemical substance consisting of a single kind of atom (a free element), or it can mean that kind of atom as a component of various chemical substances. For example, water (H_{2}O) consists of the elements hydrogen (H) and oxygen (O) even though it does not contain the chemical substances (di)hydrogen (H_{2}) and (di)oxygen (O_{2}), as H_{2}O molecules are different from H_{2} and O_{2} molecules. For the meaning "chemical substance consisting of a single kind of atom", the terms "elementary substance" and "simple substance" have been suggested, but they have not gained much acceptance in English chemical literature, whereas in some other languages their equivalent is widely used. For example, French distinguishes élément chimique (kind of atoms) and corps simple (chemical substance consisting of one kind of atom); Russian distinguishes химический элемент and простое вещество.

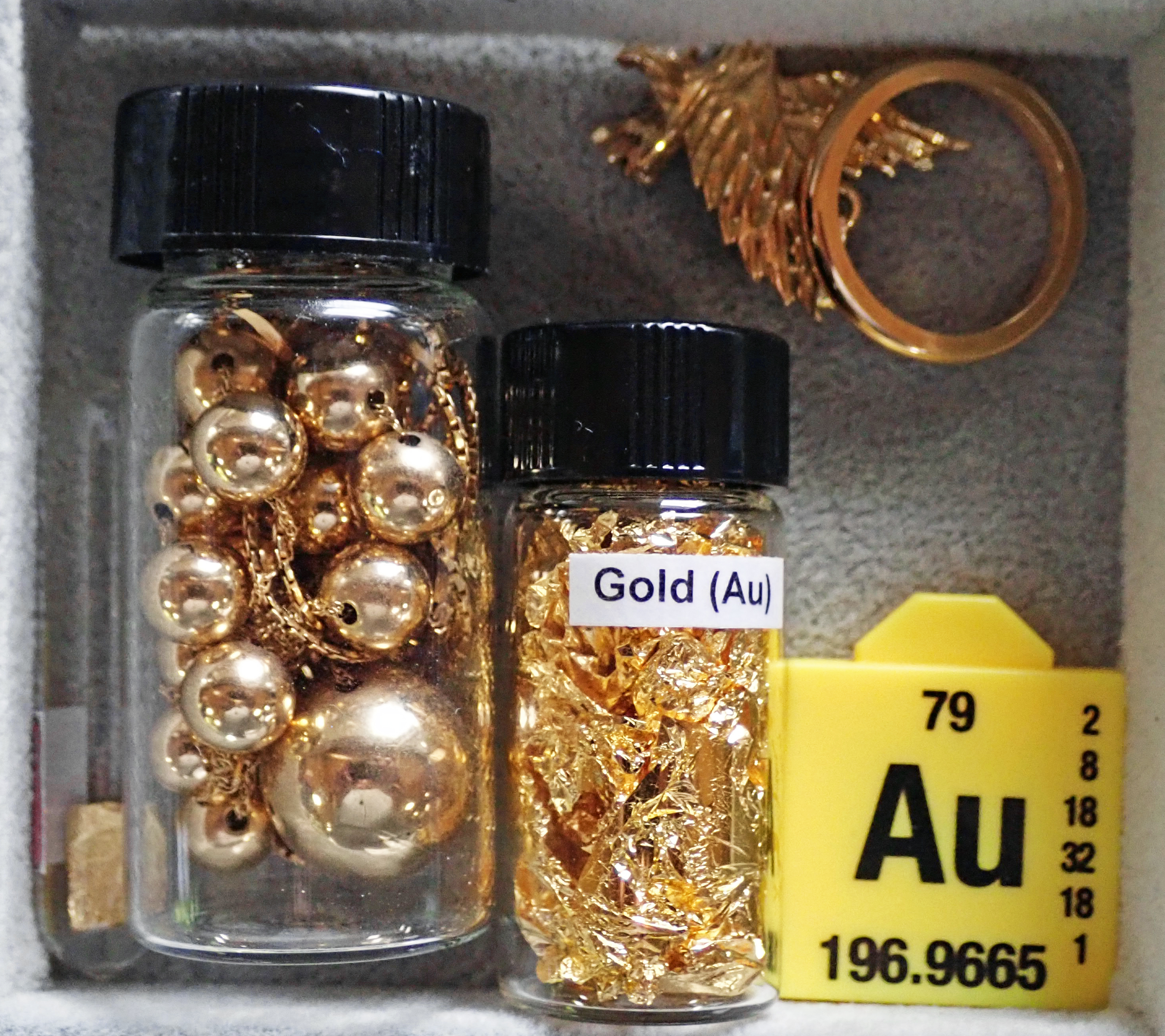
Illustration of two meanings of "chemical element": gold as an atom and gold as a substance

Chemical elements can be organized by name, chemical symbol, and also by properties (as atoms or as substances). The properties of chemical elements as kinds of atom include the atomic number, atomic weight, isotopes, abundance in nature, ionization energy, electron affinity, oxidation states, and electronegativity. The radioactive nuclides can be arranged by length of half-life. As substances, the properties of chemical elements include their density, melting point, boiling point, electrical conductance, thermal conductivity.

One of the most convenient, and certainly the most traditional presentation of the elements, is in the form of the periodic table, which groups together elements with similar chemical properties (and usually also similar electronic structures). Chemical elements can be categorised by their origin on Earth, with the first 94 considered naturally occurring, while those with atomic numbers beyond 94 have only been produced artificially via human-made nuclear reactions.

=== Occurrence ===
The lightest elements are hydrogen and helium, both created by Big Bang nucleosynthesis in the first 20 minutes of the universe in a ratio of around 3:1 by mass (or 12:1 by number of atoms), along with tiny traces of the next two elements, lithium and beryllium. Almost all other elements found in nature were made by various natural methods of nucleosynthesis. On Earth, small amounts of new atoms are naturally produced in nucleogenic reactions, or in cosmogenic processes, such as cosmic ray spallation. New atoms are also naturally produced on Earth as radiogenic daughter isotopes of ongoing radioactive decay processes such as alpha decay, beta decay, spontaneous fission, cluster decay, and other rarer modes of decay.

There are now 118 known elements. "Known" here means observed well enough, even from just a few decay products, to have been differentiated from other elements. Most recently, the synthesis of element 118 (since named oganesson) was reported in October 2006, and the synthesis of element 117 (tennessine) was reported in April 2010. Of these 118 elements, the first 94 elements have been detected directly on Earth as primordial nuclides present from the formation of the Solar System, or as naturally occurring fission or transmutation products of uranium and thorium. Six of these occur in extreme trace amounts: technetium, atomic number 43; promethium, number 61; astatine, number 85; francium, number 87; neptunium, number 93; and plutonium, number 94. These six elements have been detected in the universe at large, in the spectra of stars, as well as neutron star mergers and supernovae, where short-lived radioactive elements are newly being made.

Two or more atoms can combine to form molecules. Some elements form molecules of atoms of said element only: e.g. atoms of hydrogen (H) form diatomic molecules (H_{2}). Chemical compounds are substances made of atoms of different elements; they can have molecular or non-molecular structure. Mixtures are materials containing different chemical substances; that means (in case of molecular substances) that they contain different types of molecules. When different elements undergo chemical reactions, atoms are rearranged into new compounds held together by chemical bonds. Less than twenty elements, including the gold, platinum, iron group metals, can sometimes be found uncombined as relatively pure native element minerals. Nearly all other naturally occurring elements exist in the Earth as compounds or mixtures. Air is mostly a mixture of molecular nitrogen and oxygen, though it does contain compounds including carbon dioxide and water, as well as atomic argon, a noble gas which is chemically inert and therefore does not undergo chemical reactions.

== Atomic nucleus properties ==
The standard model of an atom is of a dense nucleus of charged protons and electrically-neutral neutrons, surrounded by an electrically-bound cloud of low mass, negatively charged electrons. Despite the force of mutual repulsion between the protons, the nucleus is held together by the short-ranged strong nuclear force between the particles. The neutron–proton ratio determines the stability of a nucleus, as a proper balance of neutrons counteracts the mutual repulsion of the protons.

=== Nuclide ===
Nuclide chart displaying of the number of protons (Z) versus neutrons (N) for each isotope, with the color showing resulting half life

A nuclide, or nuclear species, is a class of atoms characterized by their number of protons, Z, their number of neutrons, N, and their nuclear energy state. Atomic nuclei other than ^{1}_{1}H, a lone proton, consist of protons and neutrons bound together by the residual strong force, overcoming electrical repulsion between protons. For that reason, neutrons are required to bind protons together; as the number of protons increases, so does the neutron–proton ratio necessary for stability. For example, although light elements up through oxygen have stable nuclides with the same number of neutrons as protons, lead requires about 3 neutrons for 2 protons.

The atomic number of an element is equal to the number of protons in each atom, and defines the element. For example, all carbon atoms contain 6 protons in their atomic nucleus; so the atomic number of carbon is 6. The number of protons in the nucleus determines its electric charge, which in turn determines the number of bound electrons of an atom in its non-ionized state. The electrons occupy atomic orbitals that determine the atom's chemical properties.

Isotopes are atoms of the same element (that is, with the same number of protons in their nucleus), but having different numbers of neutrons. Thus, for example, there are three main isotopes of carbon. All carbon atoms have 6 protons, but they can have either 6, 7, or 8 neutrons. Since the mass numbers of these are 12, 13 and 14 respectively, said three isotopes are known as carbon-12, carbon-13, and carbon-14 (^{12}C, ^{13}C, and ^{14}C). Natural carbon is a mixture of ^{12}C (about 98.9%), ^{13}C (about 1.1%) and about 1 atom per trillion of ^{14}C. The number of neutrons in a nucleus usually has very little effect on an element's chemical properties. An exception is hydrogen, for which the kinetic isotope effect is significant. Thus, all carbon isotopes have nearly identical chemical properties because they all have six electrons, even though they may have 6 to 8 neutrons. That is why atomic number, rather than mass number or atomic weight, is considered the identifying characteristic of an element.

=== Stability ===
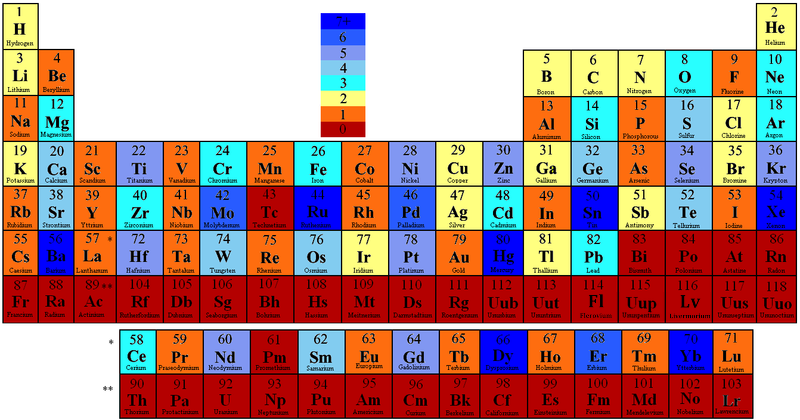
Periodic table by number of stable isotopes, ranging from zero (red) to 7+ (blue)

All elements have radioactive isotopes (radioisotopes), but many of these radioisotopes are not found in nature due to a low half life. Radioisotopes typically decay into other elements via alpha decay, beta decay, or inverse beta decay; some isotopes of the heaviest elements also undergo spontaneous fission. Isotopes that are not radioactive, are termed "stable" isotopes. Isotopes with even numbers of protons, even numbers of neutrons, or both, tend to be more stable as like particle can pair up with like. This pairing effect allows the identical particles to align with opposite spins, increasing the binding energy.

Most (54 of 94) naturally occurring elements have more than one stable isotope. Only 26 elements are monoisotopic, having exactly one stable isotope; these have an odd atomic number of protons, with the exception of beryllium-9 which has an odd number of neutrons. The mean number of stable isotopes for the 80 stable elements is 3.1 stable isotopes per element. The largest number of stable isotopes for a single element is 10 (for tin, element 50).

Elements with atomic numbers 1 through 82 each have at least one stable isotope (except for technetium, element 43 and promethium, element 61, which have no stable isotopes). However, observationally stable isotopes of some elements (such as tungsten and lead) are predicted to be slightly radioactive with very long half-lives: for example, the half-lives predicted for the observationally stable lead isotopes range from 10^{35} to 10^{189} years. Isotopes are observationally stable when they are theoretically unstable but no radioactive decay has yet been observed. Out of the over 250 nuclides that are called stable, only 90 are considered theoretically stable, meaning they lack a known decay mode.

A graph of isotope stability, with the magic numbers that make a nucleus more stable

Elements with atomic numbers 83 through 94 are unstable enough that radioactive decay of all isotopes can be detected. Some of these elements, notably bismuth (atomic number 83), thorium (atomic number 90), and uranium (atomic number 92), have one or more isotopes with half-lives long enough to survive from before the Solar System formed. The remaining longest-lived isotopes have half lives too short for them to have been present at the beginning of the Solar System, and are therefore "transient elements". Of these 11 transient elements, five (polonium, radon, radium, actinium, and protactinium) are relatively common decay products of thorium and uranium. The remaining six transient elements (technetium, promethium, astatine, francium, neptunium, and plutonium) occur only rarely, as products of rare decay modes or nuclear reaction processes involving uranium or other heavy elements.

The remaining 24 heaviest elements (those beyond plutonium, element 94) are radioactive, with half-lives so short that they are not found on Earth and must be synthesized. Five have been discovered in the spectrum of Przybylski's star, from element 95 (americium) to 99 (einsteinium). These are thought to be neutron capture products of uranium and thorium. All 24 heavier elements are radioactive, with short half-lives; if any of these elements were present when the Earth formed, they are certain to have completely decayed, and if present in novae, are in quantities too small to have been noted. Technetium was the first purportedly non-naturally occurring element synthesized, in 1937, though traces of technetium have since been found in nature (and also the element may have been discovered naturally in 1925). This pattern of artificial production and later natural discovery has been repeated with several other radioactive naturally occurring rare elements.

The lightest radioactive isotope is tritium, which undergoes Beta decay with a half-life of 12.3 years. At 2×10^{19} years, over 10^{9} times the estimated age of the universe, bismuth-209 has the longest known alpha decay half-life of any nuclide, and is almost always considered on par with the 80 stable elements. The isotope tellurium-128 transmutes through double beta decay with a half life of 2.25×10^{24} years, over 100,000 times longer than bismuth-209. The primary source of radiation exposure from isotope decays in the human body come from carbon-14 and potassium-40 intake, which produce an annual effective dose of 0.17 mSv.

=== Isotopic mass and atomic mass ===
The mass number of an element, A, is the number of nucleons (protons and neutrons) in the atomic nucleus. Different isotopes of a given element are distinguished by their mass number, which is written as a superscript on the left hand side of the chemical symbol (e.g., ^{238}U). The mass number is always an integer and has units of "nucleons". Thus, magnesium-24 (24 is the mass number) is an atom with 24 nucleons (12 protons and 12 neutrons).

Nuclear binding energy versus mass number for common nuclides, illustrating how the binding energy peaks with isotopes of iron and nickel.

Whereas the mass number simply counts the total number of neutrons and protons and is thus an integer, the atomic mass of a particular isotope (or "nuclide") of the element is the mass of a single atom of that isotope, and is typically expressed in daltons (symbol: Da), aka universal atomic mass units (symbol: u). Its relative atomic mass is a dimensionless number equal to the atomic mass divided by the atomic mass constant, which equals 1 Da. In general, the mass number of a given nuclide differs in value slightly from its relative atomic mass. This mass deficit is primarily due to the nuclear binding energy. For example, the atomic mass of chlorine-35 to five significant digits is 34.969 Da and that of chlorine-37 is 36.966 Da. However, the relative atomic mass of each isotope is quite close to its mass number (always within 1%). The only isotope whose atomic mass is exactly a natural number is ^{12}C, which has a mass of 12 Da; because the dalton is defined as 1/12 of the mass of a free neutral carbon-12 atom in the ground state.

During the nuclear fusion of lower mass atoms such as hydrogen, the net change in mass deficit is released as energy, as determined by the mass–energy equivalence relationship. This process of fusing hydrogen atoms into helium is what drives the energy output of the Sun. Over time, the result is an increasing concentration of helium at the stellar core. During the evolution of stars much more massive than the Sun, increasingly massive nuclei are then formed through a type of fusion called the alpha process, until iron-52 is reached. The binding energy of a nucleus reaches its peak value for isotopes of iron and nickel. Hence, beyond that point, further fusion results in a lower binding energy, so energy is absorbed rather than released. As a result, an inert iron core forms that does not contribute to the star's energy output.

In the nuclear fission process, the resulting particles have a higher net binding energy. This change in the net mass deficit again results in a release of energy. Hence, highly radioactive elements such as uranium-235 can be useful sources of energy production.

The standard atomic weight (commonly called "atomic weight") of an element is the average of the atomic masses of all the chemical element's isotopes as found in a particular environment, weighted by isotopic abundance, relative to the atomic mass unit. This number may be a fraction that is not close to a whole number. For example, the relative atomic mass of chlorine is 35.453 u, which differs greatly from a whole number as it is an average of about 76% chlorine-35 and 24% chlorine-37. Whenever a relative atomic mass value differs by more than ≈1% from a whole number, it is due to this averaging effect, as significant amounts of more than one isotope are naturally present in a sample of that element.

=== Chemically pure and isotopically pure ===
Chemists and nuclear scientists have different definitions of a pure element. In chemistry, a pure element means a substance whose atoms all (or in practice almost all) have the same atomic number, or number of protons. Nuclear scientists, however, define a pure element as one that consists of only one isotope.

For example, a copper wire is 99.99% chemically pure if 99.99% of its atoms are copper, with 29 protons each. However it is not isotopically pure since natural copper consists of two stable isotopes, 69% ^{63}Cu and 31% ^{65}Cu, with different numbers of neutrons. However, pure gold would be both chemically and isotopically pure, since ordinary gold consists only of one isotope, ^{197}Au.

== Chemical and physical properties ==
Quantum mechanics causes the bound electrons to be organized into a set of layered shells. Each shell can only contain a fixed number of electrons occupying paired orbitals. The electron configurations of these shells mediate the interaction with neighboring atoms and determine the chemical properties of atoms. The shell configuration determines the structure of the periodic table.

=== Shells ===
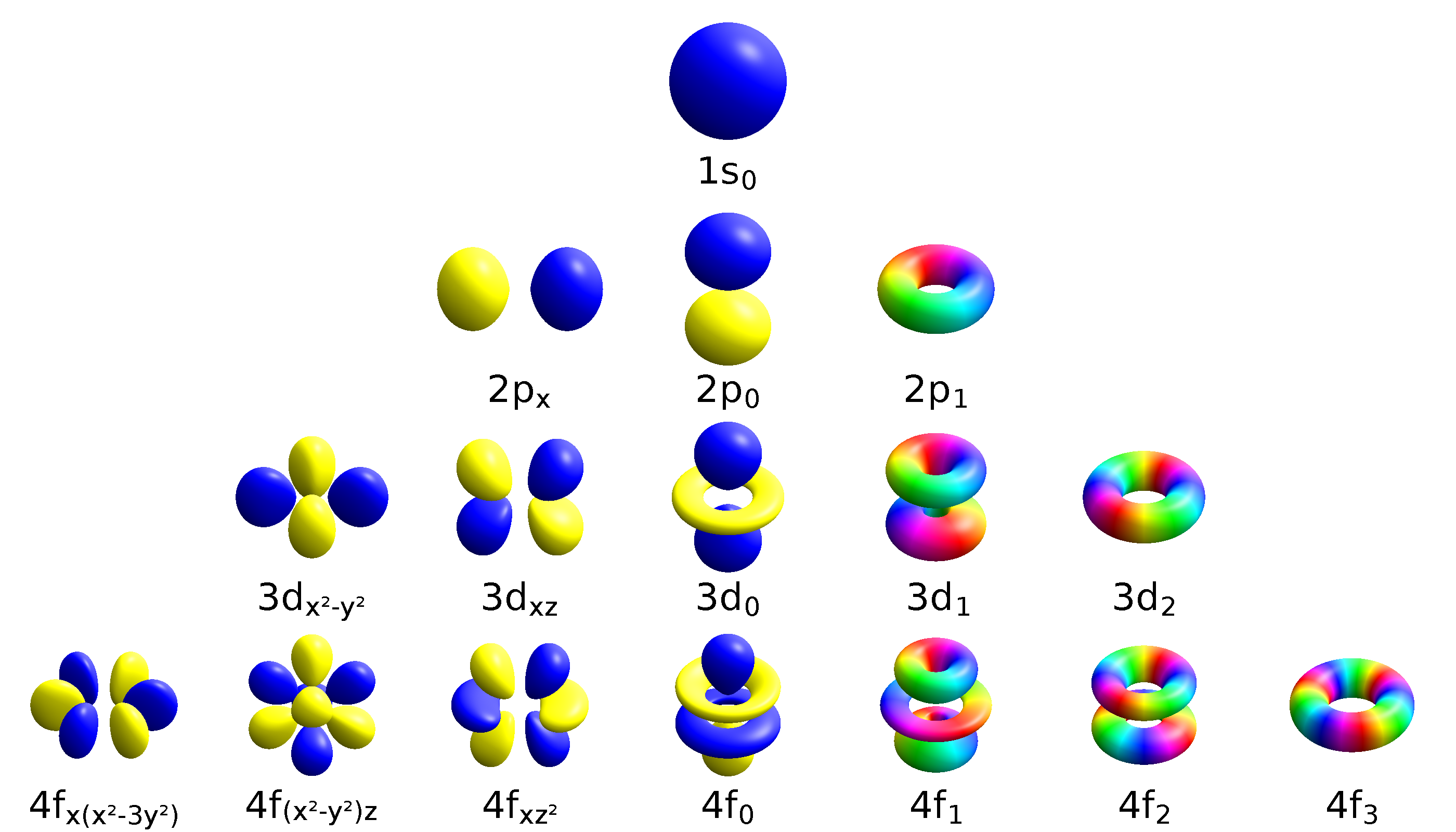
Atomic single-electron orbitals for the lowest four quantum numbers

Electrons that are confined to an atom are only allowed to assume certain discrete energy levels. This restriction, known as quantization, is a fundamental facet of the quantum mechanics theory that predicts the wave-like behavior of particles and energy at the smallest scale. For atoms, these energy levels are represented by electron subshells, where the wave form of an electron is held in a type of standing wave with a specific wavelength. Each whole number of wavelengths yields one or more atomic orbitals, which describe each the electron's charge distribution at that energy level. Every orbital can hold a pair of electrons. The arrangement of electrons in an atom's orbitals is called the electron configuration.

These orbitals and their sub-shells are grouped together in shells, with each shell having a principal quantum number that indicates the energy level. Each shell can only have a fixed number of electrons, which is given by the formula $2n^2$, where $n$ is 1, 2, 3, 4, and so on. Hence, the count of electrons each shell can contain are 2, 8, 18, 32, and so forth. A shell is represented by a row on the periodic table.

The simplest atom is ordinary hydrogen, which consists of one proton and one electron. In its minimum energy ground state, the electron occupies the first shell, designated K. This shell has one subshell designated 1s. The second element, helium, has two protons, two electrons, and usually two neutrons. The second electron occupies the same orbital as the first, completing the shell with spin-paired electrons. For lithium there are three electrons, so one needs to occupy an orbital in the second shell, designated L. Per the Aufbau principle, the third electron occupies the next lowest available energy subshell, which is 2s. This process continues, with successive electrons being placed in the next available lowest energy orbital.

=== Periodic trends ===
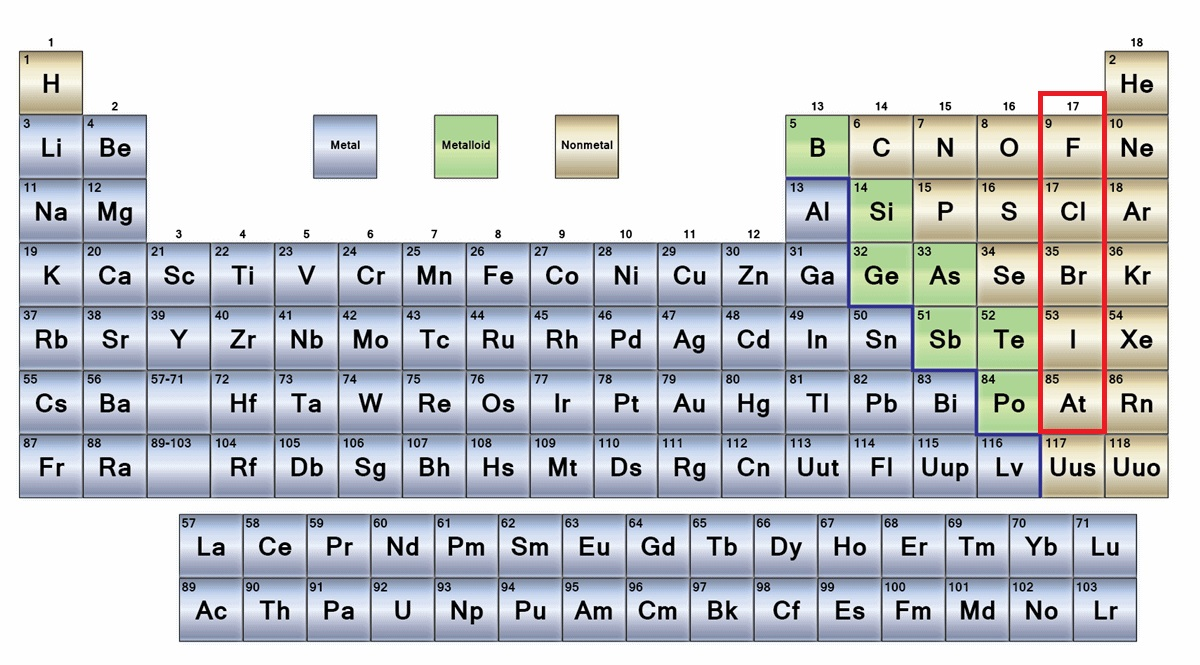
Metals (blue) and metalloids (green) in the periodic table

Several terms are commonly used to characterise the general physical and chemical properties of the chemical elements. A first distinction is between metals, which readily conduct electricity, nonmetals, which do not, and a small group, the metalloids, having intermediate properties and often behaving as semiconductors.

Besides being different by physical properties as substances, metallic and nonmetallic elements have different chemical properties as kinds of atoms: metallic elements form simple cations, whereas nonmetallic elements (and weak metals) form simple anions and oxoanions. An exception is noble gases, which do not form simple anions, whereas oxoanions are known for xenon. However, some metallic elements in higher oxidation states form oxoanions as well. Atoms of nonmetallic elements also form compounds with covalent bonds.

Distinguishing terms are used for certain sets of the more broadly viewed metals and nonmetals. These sets include: actinides, alkali metals, alkaline earth metals, halogens, lanthanides, transition metals, post-transition metals, metalloids, reactive nonmetals, and noble gases. In this system, the alkali metals, alkaline earth metals, and transition metals, as well as the lanthanides and the actinides, are special groups of the metals viewed in a broader sense. Similarly, the reactive nonmetals and the noble gases are nonmetals viewed in the broader sense. In some presentations, the halogens are not distinguished, with astatine identified as a metalloid and the others identified as nonmetals.

A more refined classification is often shown in coloured presentations of the periodic table. The properties of the elements can be summarized in this form, which powerfully and elegantly organizes the elements by physical and chemical properties. Each row forms a period of elements that have the same number of electron shells. There are 18 numbered groups, each forming its own column of elements whose chemical properties are dominated by the orbital location of the outermost electron. A block is set of elements sharing atomic orbitals that their valence electrons or vacancies occupy.

Use of the periodic table is now ubiquitous in chemistry, providing an extremely useful framework to classify, systematize and compare all the many different forms of chemical behavior. The table has also found wide application in physics, geology, biology, materials science, engineering, agriculture, medicine, nutrition, environmental health, and astronomy. Its principles are especially important in chemical engineering.

=== Phase transition ===
Phase diagram of hydrogen, showing the element state for different combinations of temperature and pressure. Theoretically, at a sufficiently high pressure (such as the interior of Jupiter), hydrogen becomes metallic.

A commonly used basic distinction among the elements is their state of matter (phase), whether solid, liquid, or gas, at standard temperature and pressure (STP). Most elements are solids at STP, while several are gases. Only bromine and mercury are liquid at 0 degrees Celsius (32 degrees Fahrenheit) and 1 atmosphere pressure; caesium and gallium are solid at that temperature, but melt at 28.4 °C (83.1 °F) and 29.8 °C (85.6 °F), respectively.

Melting and boiling points, typically expressed in degrees Celsius at a pressure of one atmosphere, are commonly used in characterizing the various elements. Those elements with boiling points above 2,000 C are termed refractory, while those easily vaporized are volatiles. The element with the widest range between melting and boiling points is gallium, which boils at 2,204 °C (3,999 °F). While known for most elements, either or both of these measurements is still undetermined for some of the radioactive elements available in only tiny quantities. Since helium remains a liquid even at absolute zero at atmospheric pressure, it has only a boiling point, and not a melting point, in conventional presentations.

=== Allotropes ===
Atoms of the same element may bond to each other chemically in more than one way, allowing the pure element to exist in multiple chemical structures (spatial arrangements of atoms) which differ in their properties. The ability of an element to polymorph in one of many structural forms is known as 'allotropy'. Non-metallic elements known for polymorphism include carbon, sulfur, phosphorus, oxygen, and nitrogen.

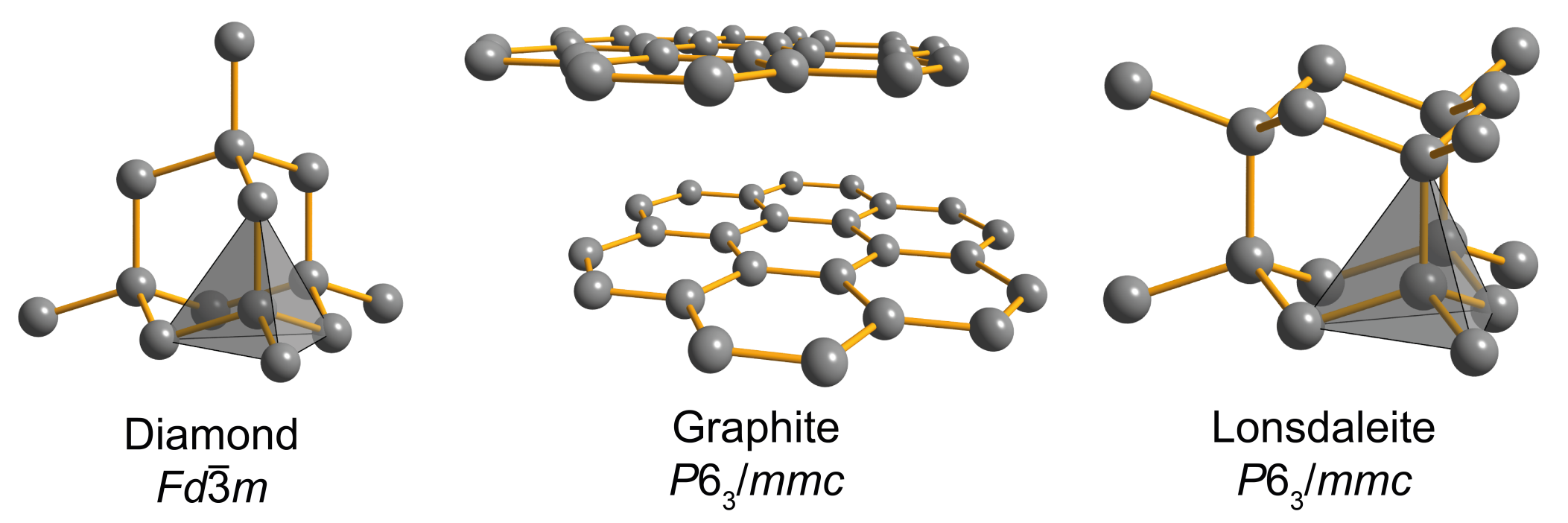
Three of the eight carbon allotropes

For example, carbon can be found as diamond, which has a tetrahedral structure around each carbon atom; graphite, which has layers of carbon atoms with a hexagonal structure stacked on top of each other; graphene, which is a single layer of graphite that is very strong; fullerenes, which have nearly spherical shapes; and carbon nanotubes, which are tubes with a hexagonal structure (even these may differ from each other in electrical properties).

The reference state of an element is defined by convention, usually as the thermodynamically most stable allotrope and physical state at a pressure of 1 bar and a given temperature (typically 298.15 K). However, for phosphorus, the reference state is white phosphorus even though it is not the most stable allotrope, and the reference state for carbon is graphite, because the structure of graphite is more stable than that of the other allotropes. In thermochemistry, an element is defined to have an enthalpy of formation of zero in its reference state.

=== Crystal structures ===
Under conditions of stable equilibrium, solid elements are structured into a crystalline form, with each element having its own structure. These belong to the seven families of crystal structures: cubic (including body-centered and face-centered), triclinic, hexagonal, monoclinic, orthorhombic, rhombohedral, and tetragonal. Over 30 elements crystallize in the cubic form. 40% of the elements form close-packed crystals: either face-centered cubic or hexagonal close-packed. For some of the synthetically produced transuranic elements, available samples have been too small to determine crystal structures.

Under the high pressure conditions found within a planetary interior, elements can appear in new crystalline forms, forming allotropes. For example, seven dense classes of silicon crystals can appear at pressures from 1 MPa to 100 GPa, under room temperature conditions. In the extreme conditions found inside a carbon-rich white dwarf, diamond-like amorphous glass may form.

=== Mass densities ===
The density at selected standard temperature and pressure (STP) is often used in characterizing the elements. The mass density of an element depends on the mass of the atomic nucleus and the separation between the atoms created by the bound electrons. Density is given in kilograms per cubic meter (kg/m^{3}), but may also be expressed in grams per cubic centimetre (g/cm^{3}). Since several elements are gases at commonly encountered temperatures, their densities are usually stated for their gaseous forms; when liquefied or solidified, the gaseous elements have densities similar to those of the other elements. The general trend is for densities to increase as the atomic number rises. Lower density elements are the noble gases and the alkali metals. Higher densities are found in the middle of the rows of the periodic elements, as they can form more covalent bonds, drawing the atoms closer together.

Variation in atomic radius by atomic number, listing hydrogen and the alkali elements

Atoms do not have a fixed radius, but rather their dimension is determined by the charge distribution of their electron cloud. The measured size depends on the interaction of this cloud with the instrument used to measure it. Hence, various methods will give similar, but slightly different results. Along each row of the periodic table, the radius tends to decrease from the alkali metal column to the noble gases. This is caused by the increasing attraction of the nuclear charge overcoming the mutual repulsion of the electrons as a shell is filled. A smaller radius means the atom is less chemically reactive, as the valence electrons are drawn closer to the nucleus. Depending on the type of chemical bond, the atomic radius determines the atomic separation in a crystal, and hence the mass density.

When an element has allotropes with different densities, one representative allotrope is typically selected in summary presentations, while densities for each allotrope can be stated where more detail is provided. For example, the three familiar allotropes of carbon (amorphous carbon, graphite, and diamond) have densities of 1.8–2.1, 2.267, and 3.515 g/cm^{3}, respectively.

== Nomenclature and symbols ==
The various chemical elements are formally identified by their unique atomic numbers, their accepted names, and their chemical symbols.

=== Atomic numbers ===
The known elements have atomic numbers from 1 to 118, conventionally presented as Arabic numerals. Since the elements can be uniquely sequenced by atomic number, conventionally from lowest to highest (as in a periodic table), sets of elements are sometimes specified by such notation as "through", "beyond", or "from ... through", as in "through iron", "beyond uranium", or "from lanthanum through lutetium". The terms "light" and "heavy" are sometimes also used informally to indicate relative atomic numbers (not densities), as in "lighter than carbon" or "heavier than lead", though their atomic weights of the elements do not always increase monotonically with their atomic numbers. For example, argon with an atomic number of 18 has an atomic weight of 39.95, while potassium with an atomic number of 19 has an atomic weight of 39.098.

=== Element names ===
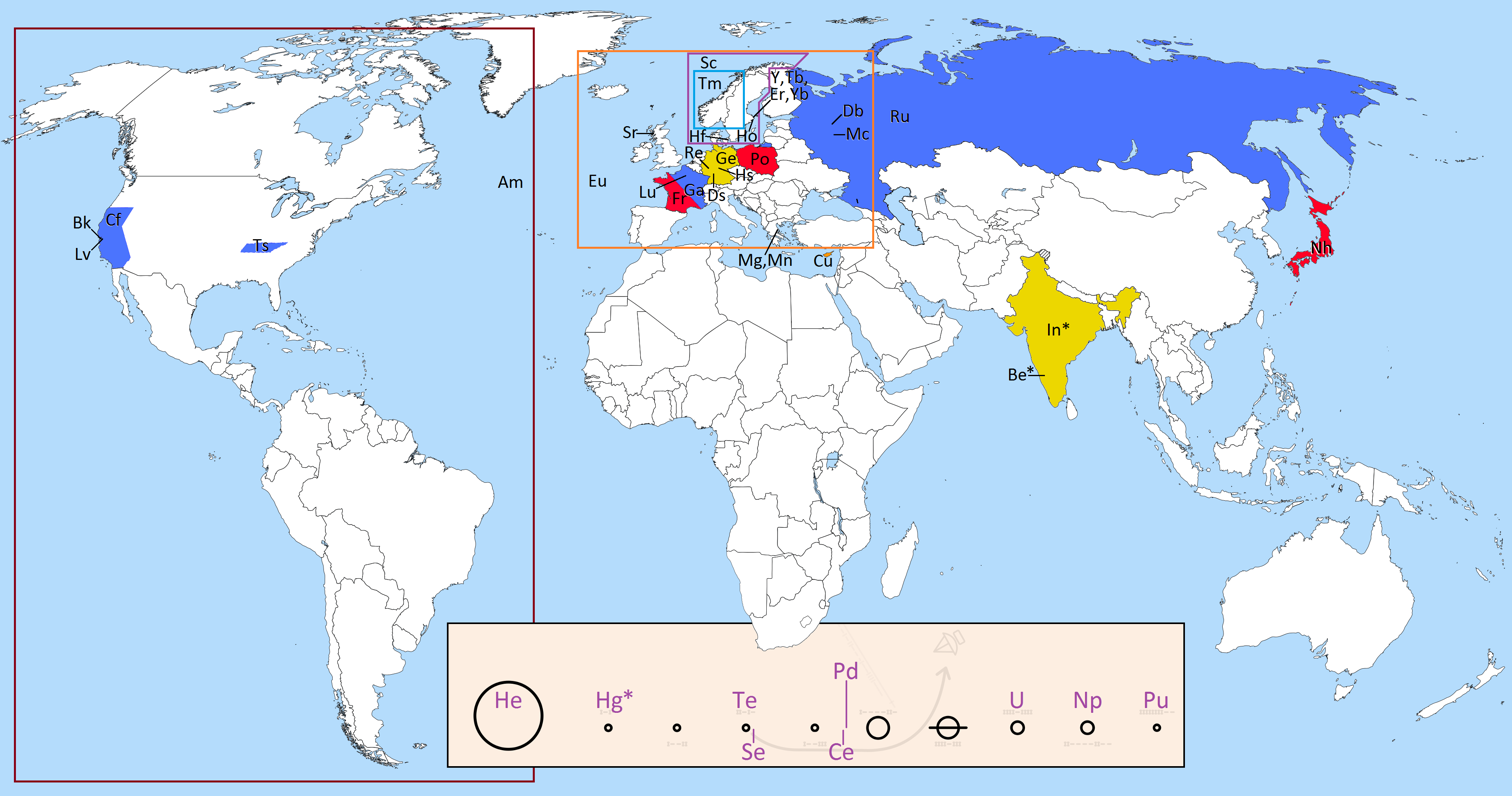
Map illustrating the place names of 41 of the chemical elements on Earth and (inset) in the Solar System

The naming of various substances now known as elements precedes the atomic theory of matter, as names were given locally by various cultures to various minerals, metals, compounds, alloys, mixtures, and other materials, though at the time it was not known which chemicals were elements and which compounds. As they were identified as elements, the existing names for anciently known elements (e.g., gold, mercury, iron) were kept in most countries.

National differences emerged over the element names either for convenience, linguistic niceties, or nationalism. For example, German speakers use "Wasserstoff" (water stuff) for "hydrogen", "Sauerstoff" (acid stuff) for "oxygen", and "Stickstoff" (smothering stuff) for "nitrogen"; English and some other languages use "sodium" for "natrium", and "potassium" for "kalium"; and the French, Italians, Greeks, Portuguese and Poles prefer "azote/azot/azoto" (from roots meaning "no life") for "nitrogen".

In the past, the name for new elements was traditionally decided by their discoverers. This changed in 1947, when a conference of the International Union of Pure and Applied Chemistry (IUPAC) decided that the names and symbols of new elements would be determined by the IUPAC. The discoverer of a new element had the right to suggest a name, but for purposes of international communication and trade, the official names of the chemical elements both ancient and more recently recognised are decided by the IUPAC.

The IUPAC organization has decided on a style of international English language as a Lingua franca, drawing on traditional English names even when an element's chemical symbol is based on a Latin or other traditional word. For example, adopting "gold" rather than "aurum" as the name for the 79th element (Au). IUPAC prefers the British spellings "aluminium" and "caesium" over the U.S. spellings "aluminum" and "cesium", and the U.S. "sulfur" over British "sulphur". However, elements that are practical to sell in bulk in many countries often still have locally used national names, and countries whose national language does not use the Latin alphabet are likely to use the IUPAC element names.

New elements have been named for their properties, after a mineral from which it was extracted, the location of its discovery, a mythical subject, an astronomical object, or a prominent scientist. According to IUPAC, element names are not proper nouns; therefore, the full name of an element is not capitalised in English, even if derived from a proper noun, as in californium and einsteinium. Isotope names are also uncapitalised if written out, e.g., carbon-12 or uranium-235. Chemical element symbols (such as Cf for californium and Es for einsteinium), are always capitalised.

In the second half of the 20th century, physics laboratories became able to produce elements with half-lives too short for an appreciable amount of them to exist at any time. These are also named by IUPAC, which generally adopts the name chosen by the discoverer. This practice can lead to the controversial question of which research group actually discovered an element, a question that delayed the naming of elements with atomic number of 104 and higher for a considerable amount of time.

Precursors of such controversies involved the nationalistic namings of elements in the late 19th century. For example, lutetium was named after Paris, France. The Germans were reluctant to relinquish naming rights to the French, often calling it cassiopeium. Similarly, the British discoverer of niobium originally named it columbium, in reference to the New World. It was used extensively as such by American publications before the international standardisation (in 1950).

=== Chemical symbols ===
==== Specific elements ====
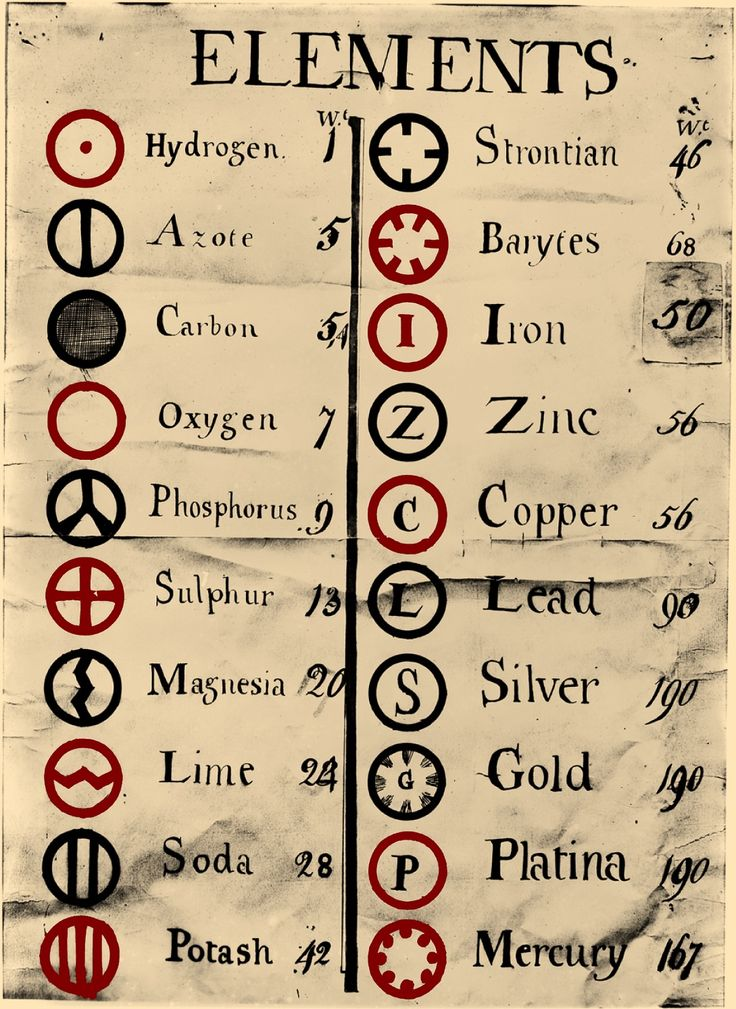
John Dalton's list of atomic weights & symbols, 1808

Before chemistry became a science, alchemists designed arcane symbols for both metals and common compounds. These were however used as abbreviations in diagrams or procedures; there was no concept of atoms combining to form molecules. With his advances in the atomic theory of matter, John Dalton devised his own simpler symbols, based on circles, to depict atoms and molecules.

The current system of chemical notation was invented by Jöns Jacob Berzelius in 1814. In this system, chemical symbols are not mere abbreviations—though each consists of letters of the Latin alphabet. They are intended as universal symbols for people of all languages and alphabets.

Since Latin was the common language of science at Berzelius' time, his symbols were abbreviations based on the Latin names of elements (they may be Classical Latin names of elements known since antiquity or Neo-Latin coinages for later elements). The symbols are not followed by a period (full stop) as with abbreviations. In most cases, Latin names of elements as used by Berzelius have the same roots as the modern English name. For example, hydrogen has the symbol "H" from Neo-Latin hydrogenium, which has the same Greek roots as English hydrogen. However, in eleven cases Latin (as used by Berzelius) and English names of elements have different roots. Eight of them are the seven metals of antiquity and a metalloid also known since antiquity: "Fe" (Latin ferrum) for iron, "Hg" (Latin hydrargyrum) for mercury, "Sn" (Latin stannum) for tin, "Au" (Latin aurum) for gold, "Ag" (Latin argentum) for silver, "Pb" (Latin plumbum) for lead, "Cu" (Latin cuprum) for copper, and "Sb" (Latin stibium) for antimony. The three other mismatches between Neo-Latin (as used by Berzelius) and English names are "Na" (Neo-Latin natrium) for sodium, "K" (Neo-Latin kalium) for potassium, and "W" (Neo-Latin wolframium) for tungsten. These mismatches came from different suggestings of naming the elements in the Modern era. Initially Berzelius had suggested "So" and "Po" for sodium and potassium, but he changed the symbols to "Na" and "K" later in the same year.

Elements discovered after 1814 were also assigned unique chemical symbols, based on the name of the element. The use of Latin as the universal language of science was fading, but chemical names of newly discovered elements came to be borrowed from language to language with little or no modification. Symbols of elements discovered after 1814 match their names in English, French (ignoring the acute accent on ⟨é⟩), and German (though German often allows alternate spellings with ⟨k⟩ or ⟨z⟩ instead of ⟨c⟩: e.g., the name of calcium may be spelled Calcium or Kalzium in German, but its symbol is always "Ca"). Other languages sometimes modify element name spellings: Spanish iterbio (ytterbium), Italian afnio (hafnium), Swedish moskovium (moscovium); but those modifications do not affect chemical symbols: Yb, Hf, Mc.

Chemical symbols are understood internationally when element names might require translation. There have been some differences in the past. For example, Germans in the past have used "J" (for the name Jod) for iodine, but now use "I" and Iod.

The first letter of a chemical symbol is always capitalised, and the subsequent letters, if any, are always lowercase; see the preceding examples.

==== General chemical symbols ====
There are also symbols in chemical equations for groups of elements, for example in comparative formulas. These are often a single capital letter, and the letters are reserved and not used for names of specific elements. For example, "X" indicates a variable group (usually a halogen) in a class of compounds, while "R" is a radical, meaning a compound structure such as a hydrocarbon chain. The letter "Q" is reserved for "heat" in a chemical reaction. "Y" is also often used as a general chemical symbol, though it is also the symbol of yttrium and tyrosine. "Z" is also often used as a general variable group. "E" is used in organic chemistry to denote an electron-withdrawing group or an electrophile; similarly "Nu" denotes a nucleophile. "L" is used to represent a general ligand in inorganic and organometallic chemistry. "M" is often used in place of a general metal.

At least two other, two-letter generic chemical symbols are also in informal use, "Ln" for any lanthanide and "An" for any actinide. "Rg" was formerly used for any rare gas element, but the group of rare gases has now been renamed noble gases and "Rg" now refers to roentgenium.

==== Isotope symbols ====
Isotopes of an element are distinguished by mass number (total protons and neutrons), with this number combined with the element's symbol. IUPAC prefers that isotope symbols be written in superscript notation when practical, for example ^{12}C and ^{235}U. However, other notations, such as carbon-12 and uranium-235, or C-12 and U-235, are also used.

As a special case, the three naturally occurring isotopes of hydrogen are often specified as H for ^{1}H (protium), D for ^{2}H (deuterium), and T for ^{3}H (tritium). This convention is easier to use in chemical equations, replacing the need to write out the mass number each time. Thus, the formula for heavy water may be written D_{2}O instead of ^{2}H_{2}O.

== Origin of the elements ==
Estimated distribution of dark matter and dark energy in the universe. Only the fraction of the mass and energy labeled "atoms" is composed of elements.

Only about 4.6% of the total mass of the universe is made of ordinary matter, including atoms or ions represented by elements, plus neutrinos and photons. The rest of the mass (63%) is an unknown dark matter that is not composed of atoms of elements because it contains no protons, neutrons, or electrons. The remaining non-matter part of the mass of the universe is composed of the even less well understood dark energy.

The 94 naturally occurring elements were produced by at least four classes of astrophysical process. Most of the hydrogen, helium and a very small quantity of lithium were produced in the first few minutes of the Big Bang. This Big Bang nucleosynthesis happened only once; the other processes are ongoing. Nuclear fusion inside stars produces elements through stellar nucleosynthesis, including all elements from carbon to iron in atomic number. Elements higher in atomic number than iron, including heavy elements like uranium and plutonium, are produced by various forms of explosive nucleosynthesis in supernovae and neutron star mergers. The light elements lithium, beryllium and boron are produced mostly through cosmic ray spallation (fragmentation induced by cosmic rays) of carbon, nitrogen, and oxygen.

In the early phases of the Big Bang, nucleosynthesis of hydrogen resulted in the production of hydrogen-1 (protium, ^{1}H) and helium-4 (^{4}He), as well as a smaller amount of deuterium (^{2}H) and tiny amounts (on the order of 10^{−10}) of lithium and beryllium. Even smaller amounts of boron may have been produced in the Big Bang, since it has been observed in some very old stars, while carbon has not. No elements heavier than boron were produced in the Big Bang. As a result, the primordial abundance of atoms (or ions) consisted of ~75% ^{1}H, 25% ^{4}He, and 0.01% deuterium, with only tiny traces of lithium, beryllium, and perhaps boron. Subsequent enrichment of galactic halos occurred due to stellar nucleosynthesis and supernova nucleosynthesis. However, the element abundance in intergalactic space can still closely resemble primordial conditions, unless it has been enriched by a galactic wind or some other means.

Periodic table showing the cosmogenic origin of each element in the Big Bang, or in large or small stars. Small stars can produce certain elements up to sulfur, by the alpha process. Supernovae are needed to produce "heavy" elements (those beyond iron and nickel) rapidly by neutron buildup, in the r-process. Certain large stars slowly produce other elements heavier than iron, in the s-process; these may then be blown into space in the off-gassing of planetary nebulae

On Earth (and elsewhere), trace amounts of various elements continue to be produced from other elements as products of nuclear transmutation processes. These include some produced by cosmic rays or other nuclear reactions (see cosmogenic and nucleogenic nuclides), and others produced as decay products of long-lived primordial nuclides. For example, trace (but detectable) amounts of carbon-14 (^{14}C) are continually produced in the air by cosmic rays impacting nitrogen atoms, and argon-40 (^{40}Ar) is continually produced by the decay of primordially occurring but unstable potassium-40 (^{40}K).

Three primordially occurring but radioactive actinides, thorium, uranium, and plutonium, decay through a series of recurrently produced but unstable elements such as radium and radon, which are transiently present in any sample of containing these metals. Three other radioactive elements, technetium, promethium, and neptunium, occur only incidentally in natural materials, produced as individual atoms by nuclear fission of the nuclei of various heavy elements or in other rare nuclear processes.

Besides the 94 naturally occurring elements, several artificial elements have been produced by nuclear physics technology. By 2016, these experiments had produced all elements up to atomic number 118. As of 2021, more than a thousand different isotopes have been created through nuclear transmutation, of which 900 do not appear naturally.

== Abundance ==
Plot of element abundances in the Solar System. The two general trends are: (1) an alternation of abundance in elements as they have even or odd atomic numbers (the Oddo–Harkins rule), and (2) a decrease in abundance as elements become heavier.

The abundance of elements in the Solar System is in keeping with their origin of Big Bang nucleosynthesis and a number of progenitor supernova stars. Very abundant hydrogen and helium are products of the Big Bang, but the next three elements are rare since they had little time to form in the Big Bang and are not made in stars. They are, however, produced in small quantities by the breakup of heavier elements in interstellar dust, as a result of impact by cosmic rays.

Beginning with carbon, elements are produced in stars by buildup from alpha particles (helium nuclei), resulting in an alternatingly larger abundance of elements with even atomic numbers, as these are more stable. In general, such elements up to the iron peak are made in massive stars in the process of becoming supernovas. Iron-56 is particularly common, since it is the most stable nuclide that can easily be made from alpha particles, being a product of decay of radioactive nickel-56, ultimately made from 14 helium nuclei. Elements heavier than iron and up to bismuth are made in neutron capture processes in lower mass stars, and their abundance in the universe (and on Earth) generally decreases with their atomic number.

Top Milky Way abundances
Element	Parts per million by mass
Hydrogen	739,000
Helium	240,000
Oxygen	10,400
Carbon	4,600
Neon	1,340
Iron	1,090
Nitrogen	960
Silicon	650
Magnesium	580
Sulfur	440
Potassium	210
Nickel	100

Nearby galaxies that have evolved along similar lines to the Milky Way have a corresponding enrichment of elements heavier than hydrogen and helium. The more distant galaxies are being viewed as they appeared in the past, so their abundances of elements appear closer to the primordial mixture. However, as physical laws and processes appear common throughout the visible universe, scientists expect that these galaxies evolved elements in similar abundance.

The abundance of the chemical elements on Earth varies from air to crust to ocean, and in various types of life. The abundance of elements in Earth's crust differs from that in the Solar System (as seen in the Sun and massive planets like Jupiter) mainly in selective loss of the very lightest elements (hydrogen and helium) and also volatile neon, carbon (as hydrocarbons), nitrogen and sulfur, as a result of solar heating in the early formation of the Solar System. Oxygen, the most abundant element by mass in the Earth as a whole, is retained on Earth by combination with silicon, magnesium, and iron. Aluminium at 8% by mass is more common in the Earth's crust compared to the solar abundance, but it is only 2% by mass in the mantle, which has magnesium and iron in place of aluminium. The surface abundance of iron is lower because it has migrated to the Earth's core during the process of planetary differentiation.

The composition of the human body, by contrast, more closely follows the composition of seawater—save that the human body has additional stores of carbon and nitrogen necessary to form the proteins and nucleic acids, together with phosphorus in the nucleic acids and energy transfer molecule adenosine triphosphate (ATP) that occurs in the cells of all living organisms. The bulk of all life forms on Earth consist of just six elements, described by the acronym CHNOPS: carbon, hydrogen, nitrogen, oxygen, phosphorus, and sulfur. Certain kinds of organisms require particular additional elements, for example the magnesium in chlorophyll in green plants, the calcium in mollusc shells, or the iron in the hemoglobin in vertebrates' red blood cells.

Essential elements
H																		He
Li	Be												B	C	N	O	F	Ne
Na	Mg												Al	Si	P	S	Cl	Ar
K	Ca		Sc	Ti	V	Cr	Mn	Fe	Co	Ni	Cu	Zn	Ga	Ge	As	Se	Br	Kr
Rb	Sr		Y	Zr	Nb	Mo	Tc	Ru	Rh	Pd	Ag	Cd	In	Sn	Sb	Te	I	Xe
Cs	Ba	*	Lu	Hf	Ta	W	Re	Os	Ir	Pt	Au	Hg	Tl	Pb	Bi	Po	At	Rn
Fr	Ra	**	Lr	Rf	Db	Sg	Bh	Hs	Mt	Ds	Rg	Cn	Nh	Fl	Mc	Lv	Ts	Og
		*	La	Ce	Pr	Nd	Pm	Sm	Eu	Gd	Tb	Dy	Ho	Er	Tm	Yb
		**	Ac	Th	Pa	U	Np	Pu	Am	Cm	Bk	Cf	Es	Fm	Md	No

Legend:
The six basic organic elements
Quantity elements
Essential trace elements
Essentiality or function in mammals debated
No evidence for biological action in mammals, but essential or beneficial in some organisms

In the case of the lanthanides, the definition of an essential nutrient as being indispensable and irreplaceable is not completely applicable due to their extreme chemical similarity. The stable early lanthanides La–Nd are known to stimulate the growth of various lanthanide-using organisms, and Sm–Gd show lesser effects for some such organisms. The later elements in the lanthanide series do not appear to have such effects.

== History ==
The concept of an "element" as an indivisible substance has developed through three major historical phases: Classical definitions (such as those of the ancient Greeks), chemical definitions, and atomic definitions.

=== Classical definitions ===
Ancient philosophy posited a set of classical elements to explain observed patterns in nature. These elements originally referred to earth, water, air and fire rather than the chemical elements of modern science.

The term 'elements' (stoicheia) was first used by Greek philosopher Plato around 360 BCE in his dialogue Timaeus, which includes a discussion of the composition of inorganic and organic bodies and is a speculative treatise on chemistry. Plato believed the elements introduced a century earlier by Empedocles were composed of small polyhedral forms: tetrahedron (fire), octahedron (air), icosahedron (water), and cube (earth).

Aristotle, c. 350 BCE, also used the term stoicheia and added a fifth element, aether, which formed the heavens. Aristotle defined an element as:

Element – one of those bodies into which other bodies can decompose, and that itself is not capable of being divided into other.

=== Chemical definitions ===
==== Robert Boyle ====
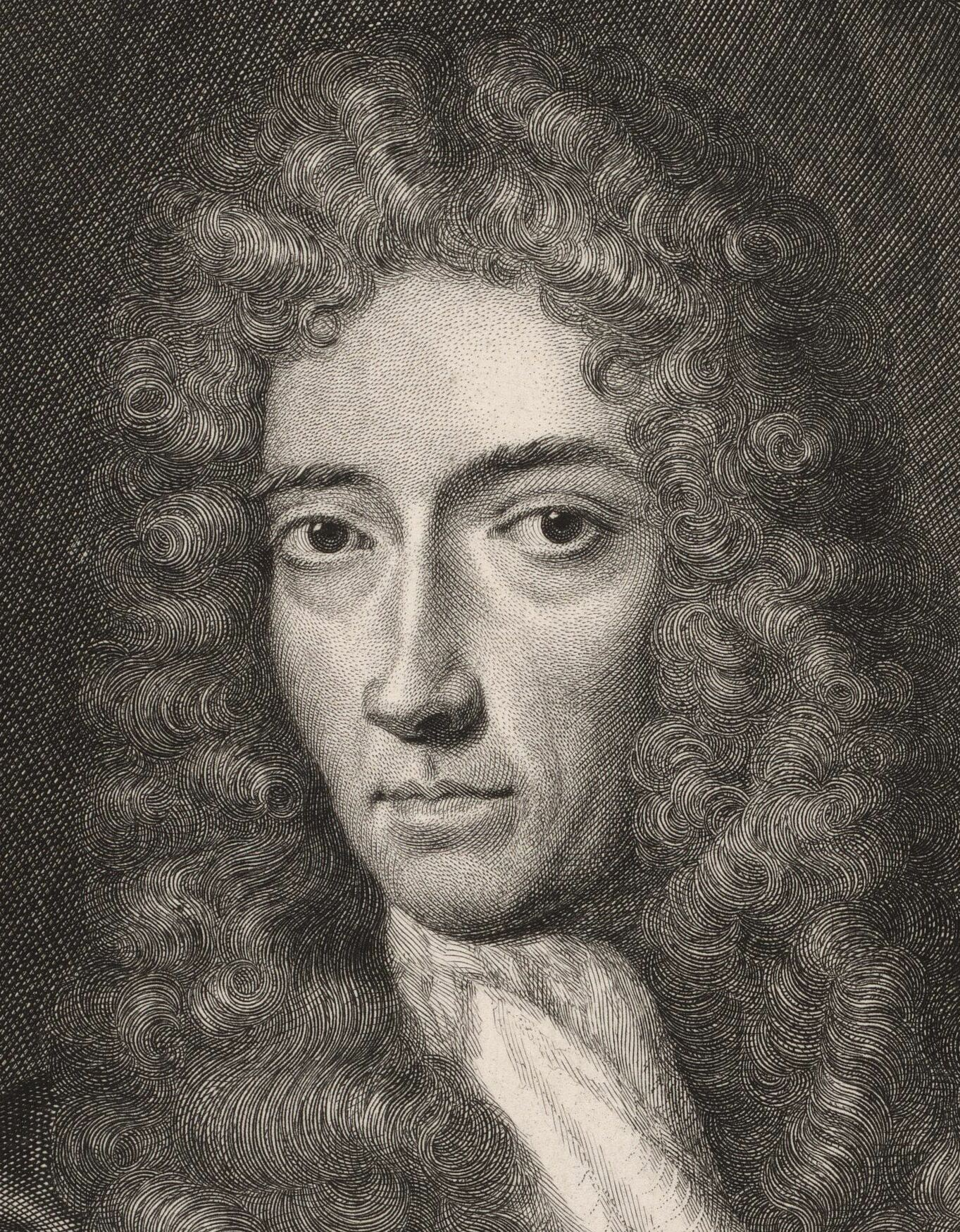
Robert Boyle, c. 1740

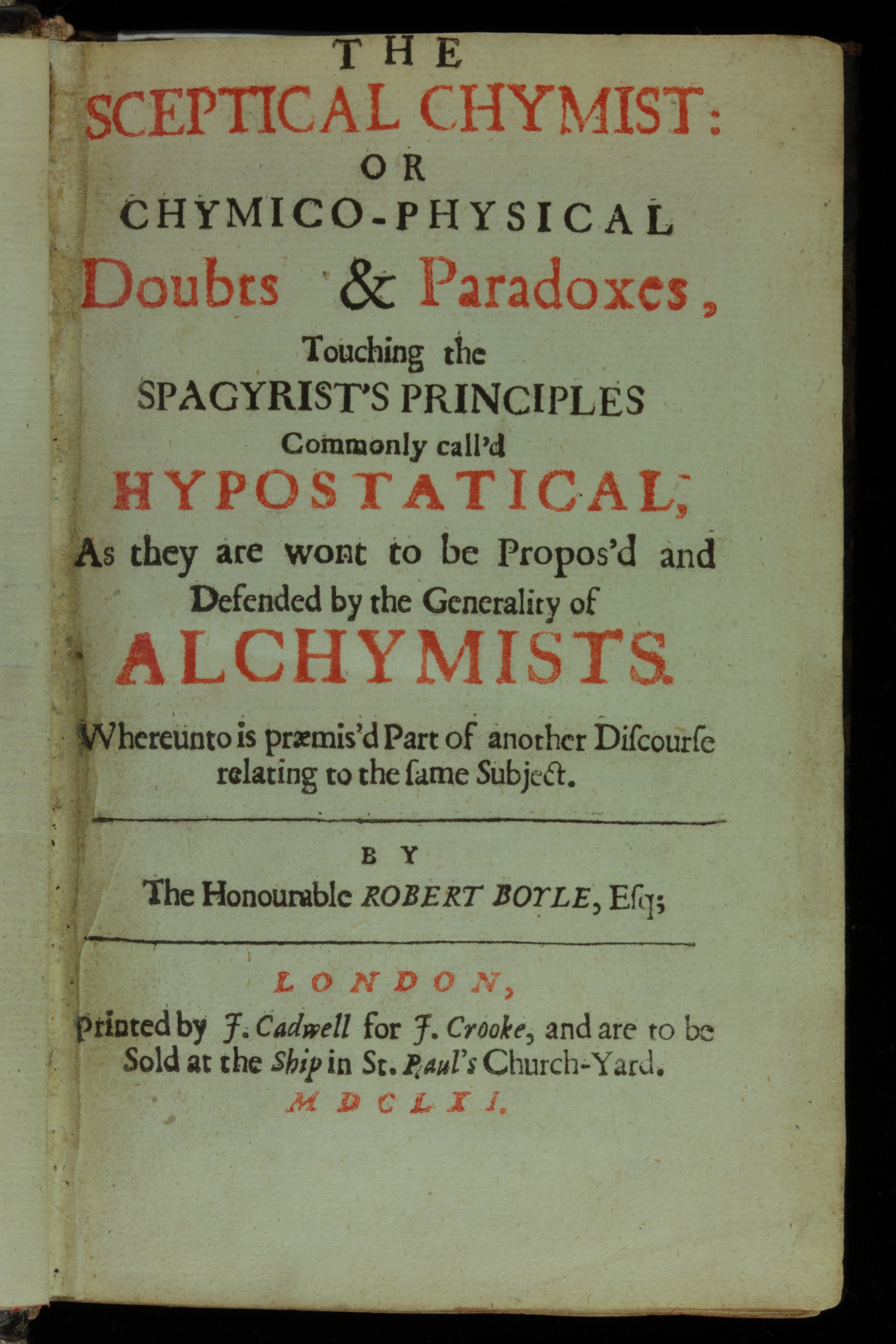
Title page of The Sceptical Chymist, published in 1661

In 1661, in The Sceptical Chymist, Robert Boyle proposed his theory of corpuscularism, which favoured the analysis of matter as constituted of irreducible units of matter (atoms). Boyle argued against deciding upon a pre-determined number of elements. This was in contrast with Aristotle's view of the four classical element and Paracelsus' view of three chemical principles of sulfur, mercury, and salt.

Much of what I am to deliver ... may be indifferently apply'd to the four Peripatetick Elements, and the three Chymical Principles ... the Chymical Hypothesis seeming to be much more countenanc'd by Experience then the other, it will be expedient to insist chiefly upon the disproving of that; especially since most of the Arguments that are imploy'd against it, may, by a little variation, be made ... at least as strongly against the less plausible, Aristotelian Doctrine.

Boyle stated his view in four propositions. In the first and second, he suggests that matter consists of particles, but that these particles may be difficult to separate. Boyle used the concept of "corpuscles"—or "atomes", as he also called them—to explain how a limited number of elements could combine into a vast number of compounds.

Propos. I. ... At the first Production of mixt Bodies, the Universal Matter whereof they ... consisted, was actually divided into little Particles. ... The Generation ... and wasting of Bodies ... and ... the Chymical Resolutions of mixt Bodies, and ... Operations of ... Fires upon them ... manifest their consisting of parts very minute... Epicurus ... as you well know, supposes ... all ... Bodies ... to be produc'd by ... Atomes, moving themselves to and fro ... in the ... Infinite Vacuum. ... Propos. II. ... These minute Particles ... were ... associated into minute ... Clusters ... not easily dissipable into such Particles as compos'd them. ... If we assigne to the Corpuscles, whereof each Element consists, a peculiar size and shape ... such ... Corpuscles may be mingled in such various Proportions, and ... connected so many ... wayes, that an almost incredible number of ... Concretes may be compos'd of them.

Boyle explained that gold reacts with aqua regia, and mercury with nitric acid, sulfuric acid, and sulfur to produce various "compounds", and that they could be recovered from those compounds, just as would be expected of elements. Yet, Boyle did not consider gold, mercury, or lead elements, but rather—together with wine—"perfectly mixt bodies".

Quicksilver ... with Aqua fortis will be brought into a ... white Powder ... with Sulphur it will compose a blood-red ... Cinaber. And yet out of all these exotick Compounds, we may recover the very same running Mercury. ... Propos. III. ... From most of such mixt Bodies ... there may by the Help of the Fire, be actually obtain'd a determinate number (whether Three, Four or Five, or fewer or more) of Substances ... The Chymists are wont to call the Ingredients of mixt Bodies, Principles, as the Aristotelians name them Elements. ... Principles ... as not being compounded of any more primary Bodies: and Elements, in regard that all mix'd Bodies are compounded of them.

Even though Boyle is primarily regarded as the first modern chemist, The Sceptical Chymist still contains old ideas about the elements, which are alien to a contemporary viewpoint. For example, sulfur is not only the familiar yellow non-metal but also an inflammable "spirit".

==== Isaac Watts ====
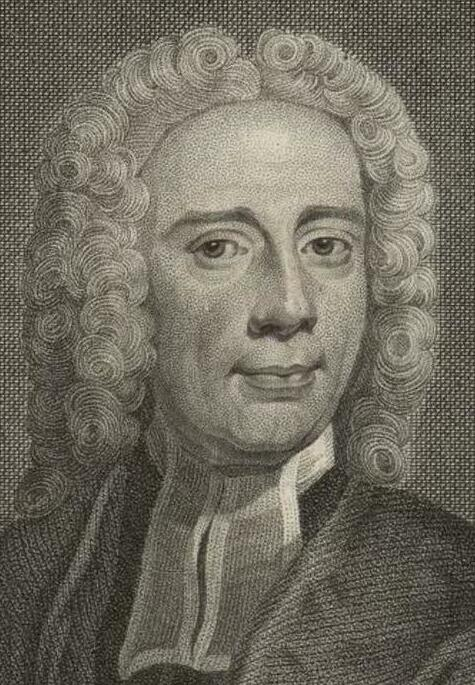
Portrait of Isaac Watts by John Shury, c. 1830

In 1724, in his book Logick, the English minister and logician Isaac Watts enumerated the elements then recognised by chemists. Watts' list of elements included two of Paracelsus' principles (sulfur and salt) and two classical elements (earth and water) as well as "spirit". Watts did, however, note a lack of consensus among chemists.

Elements are such Substances as cannot be resolved, or reduced, into two or more Substances of different Kinds. ... Followers of Aristotle made Fire, Air, Earth and Water to be the four Elements, of which all earthly Things were compounded; and they suppos'd the Heavens to be a Quintessence, or fifth sort of Body, distinct from all these : But, since experimental Philosophy ... have been better understood, this Doctrine has been abundantly refuted. The Chymists make Spirit, Salt, Sulphur, Water and Earth to be their five Elements, because they can reduce all terrestrial Things to these five :.. tho' they are not all agreed.

==== Tabulation ====
Mendeleev's 1869 periodic table: An experiment on a system of elements. Based on their atomic weights and chemical similarities.

The first modern list of elements was given in Antoine Lavoisier's 1789 Elements of Chemistry, which contained 33 elements, including light and caloric. By 1818, Jöns Jacob Berzelius had determined atomic weights for 45 of the 49 then-accepted elements. Russian chemist Dmitri Mendeleev had 63 elements in his 1869 periodic table. Though earlier precursors to this presentation exist, its invention is generally credited to Mendeleev, who intended the table to illustrate recurring trends in the properties of the elements. The layout of the table has been refined and extended over time as new elements have been discovered and new theoretical models have been developed to explain chemical behavior.

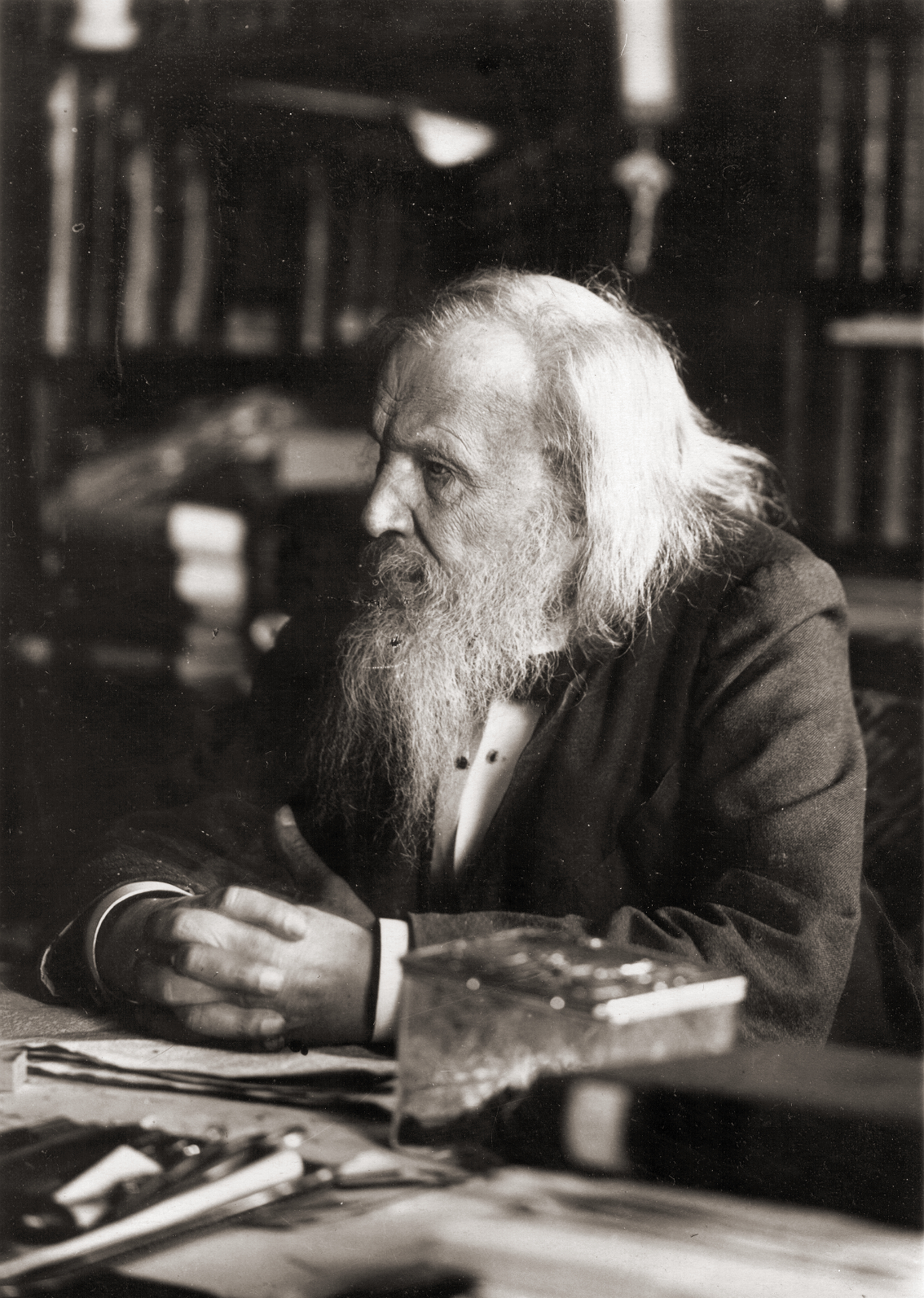
Dmitri Mendeleev, 1897

From Boyle until the early 20th century, an element was defined as a pure substance that cannot be decomposed into any simpler substance and cannot be transformed into other elements by chemical processes. Elements at the time were generally distinguished by their atomic weights, a property measurable with fair accuracy by available analytical techniques.

=== Atomic definitions ===
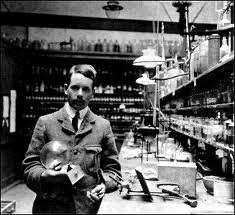
Henry Moseley

The 1913 discovery by English physicist Henry Moseley that the nuclear charge is the physical basis for the atomic number, further refined when the nature of protons and neutrons became appreciated, eventually led to the current definition of an element based on atomic number (number of protons). The use of atomic numbers, rather than atomic weights, to distinguish elements has greater predictive value (since these numbers are integers) and also resolves some ambiguities in the chemistry-based view due to varying properties of isotopes and allotropes within the same element. Currently, IUPAC defines an element to exist if it has isotopes with a lifetime longer than the 10^{−14} seconds it takes the nucleus to form an electronic cloud.

By 1914, eighty-seven elements were known, all naturally occurring (see Discovery of chemical elements). The remaining naturally occurring elements were discovered or isolated in subsequent decades, and various additional elements have also been produced synthetically, with much of that work pioneered by Glenn T. Seaborg. The final naturally-occurring radioactive element, francium, was discovered in 1939 by Marguerite Perey. In 1955, element 101 was discovered and named mendelevium in honor of D. I. Mendeleev, the first to arrange the elements periodically.

=== Discovery and recognition of various elements ===
Periodic table color coded by date of discovery, with red showing elements known since antiquity

Eleven materials familiar to various prehistoric cultures are now known to be elements: antimony, carbon, copper, gold, iron, lead, mercury, silver, sulfur, tin, and zinc. Two additional materials now accepted as elements, arsenic and bismuth, were recognised as distinct substances before 1500 AD. Platinum was known in Pre-Columbian America. The first recorded discovery of a new element was of phosphorus by the German alchemist Hennig Brand in 1669. In 1896 Henri Becquerel serendipitously discovered radioactivity from uranium.

Most of the remaining naturally occurring elements were identified and characterised by 1900, including:

- Such now-familiar industrial materials as aluminium, silicon, chromium, cobalt, nickel, magnesium, and tungsten
- Reactive metals such as lithium, sodium, potassium, and calcium
- The halogens fluorine, chlorine, bromine, and iodine
- Gases such as hydrogen, oxygen, nitrogen, helium, argon, and neon
- Most of the rare-earth elements, including cerium, lanthanum, gadolinium, and neodymium
- The more common radioactive elements, including uranium, thorium, and radium

Elements isolated or produced since 1900 include:

- The three remaining undiscovered stable elements: hafnium, lutetium, and rhenium
- Plutonium, which was first produced synthetically in 1940 by Glenn T. Seaborg, but is now also known from a few long-persisting natural occurrences
- The three incidentally occurring natural elements (neptunium, promethium, and technetium), which were all first produced synthetically but later discovered in trace amounts in geological samples
- Four scarce decay products of uranium or thorium (astatine, francium, actinium, and protactinium), and
- All known synthetic transuranic elements, beginning with americium and curium

=== Recently discovered elements ===
The first transuranium element (element with an atomic number greater than 92) discovered was neptunium in 1940. Since 1999, the IUPAC/IUPAP Joint Working Party has considered claims for the discovery of new elements. As of January 2016, all 118 elements have been confirmed by IUPAC as being discovered. The discovery of element 112 was acknowledged in 2009, and the name copernicium and the chemical symbol Cn were suggested for it. The name and symbol were officially endorsed by IUPAC on 19 February 2010. The heaviest element that is believed to have been synthesised to date is element 118, oganesson, on 9 October 2006, by the Flerov Laboratory of Nuclear Reactions in Dubna, Russia. Tennessine, element 117 was the latest element claimed to be discovered, in 2009. On 28 November 2016, scientists at the IUPAC officially recognised the names for the four newest elements, with atomic numbers 113, 115, 117, and 118.

Periodic table

Group	1	2		3	4	5	6	7	8	9	10	11	12	13	14	15	16	17	18
	Hydrogen & alkali metals	Alkaline earth metals												Triels	Tetrels	Pnictogens	Chalcogens	Halogens	Noble gases
Period 1	Hydrogen1H1.0080																		Helium2He4.0026
2	Lithium3Li6.94	Beryllium4Be9.0122												Boron5B10.81	Carbon6C12.011	Nitrogen7N14.007	Oxygen8O15.999	Fluorine9F18.998	Neon10Ne20.180
3	Sodium11Na22.990	Magnesium12Mg24.305												Aluminium13Al26.982	Silicon14Si28.085	Phosphorus15P30.974	Sulfur16S32.06	Chlorine17Cl35.45	Argon18Ar39.95
4	Potassium19K39.098	Calcium20Ca40.078		Scandium21Sc44.956	Titanium22Ti47.867	Vanadium23V50.942	Chromium24Cr51.996	Manganese25Mn54.938	Iron26Fe55.845	Cobalt27Co58.933	Nickel28Ni58.693	Copper29Cu63.546	Zinc30Zn65.38	Gallium31Ga69.723	Germanium32Ge72.630	Arsenic33As74.922	Selenium34Se78.971	Bromine35Br79.904	Krypton36Kr83.798
5	Rubidium37Rb85.468	Strontium38Sr87.62		Yttrium39Y88.906	Zirconium40Zr91.224	Niobium41Nb92.906	Molybdenum42Mo95.95	Technetium43Tc[97]	Ruthenium44Ru101.07	Rhodium45Rh102.91	Palladium46Pd106.42	Silver47Ag107.87	Cadmium48Cd112.41	Indium49In114.82	Tin50Sn118.71	Antimony51Sb121.76	Tellurium52Te127.60	Iodine53I126.90	Xenon54Xe131.29
6	Caesium55Cs132.91	Barium56Ba137.33	1 asterisk	Lutetium71Lu174.97	Hafnium72Hf178.49	Tantalum73Ta180.95	Tungsten74W183.84	Rhenium75Re186.21	Osmium76Os190.23	Iridium77Ir192.22	Platinum78Pt195.08	Gold79Au196.97	Mercury80Hg200.59	Thallium81Tl204.38	Lead82Pb207.2	Bismuth83Bi208.98	Polonium84Po[209]	Astatine85At[210]	Radon86Rn[222]
7	Francium87Fr[223]	Radium88Ra[226]	1 asterisk	Lawrencium103Lr[266]	Rutherfordium104Rf[267]	Dubnium105Db[268]	Seaborgium106Sg[269]	Bohrium107Bh[270]	Hassium108Hs[271]	Meitnerium109Mt[278]	Darmstadtium110Ds[281]	Roentgenium111Rg[282]	Copernicium112Cn[285]	Nihonium113Nh[286]	Flerovium114Fl[289]	Moscovium115Mc[290]	Livermorium116Lv[293]	Tennessine117Ts[294]	Oganesson118Og[294]
			1 asterisk	Lanthanum57La138.91	Cerium58Ce140.12	Praseodymium59Pr140.91	Neodymium60Nd144.24	Promethium61Pm[145]	Samarium62Sm150.36	Europium63Eu151.96	Gadolinium64Gd157.25	Terbium65Tb158.93	Dysprosium66Dy162.50	Holmium67Ho164.93	Erbium68Er167.26	Thulium69Tm168.93	Ytterbium70Yb173.05
			1 asterisk	Actinium89Ac[227]	Thorium90Th232.04	Protactinium91Pa231.04	Uranium92U238.03	Neptunium93Np[237]	Plutonium94Pu[244]	Americium95Am[243]	Curium96Cm[247]	Berkelium97Bk[247]	Californium98Cf[251]	Einsteinium99Es[252]	Fermium100Fm[257]	Mendelevium101Md[258]	Nobelium102No[259]

Primordial From decay Synthetic Border shows natural occurrence of the element

Standard atomic weight A_{r, std}(E)
- Ca: 40.078 — Abridged value (uncertainty omitted here)
- Po: [209] — mass number of the most stable isotope

s-block	f-block	d-block	p-block

== See also ==
- Biological roles of the elements
- Chemical database
- Discovery of chemical elements
- Element collecting
- Exotic atom
- Fictional element
- Goldschmidt classification
- Island of stability
- List of chemical elements
- List of nuclides
- List of the elements' densities
- Mineral (nutrient)
- Periodic systems of small molecules
- Prices of chemical elements
- Systematic element name
- Table of nuclides
- Roles of chemical elements

== Bibliography ==
- Boyle, R. (1661). The Sceptical Chymist: or Chymico-Physical Doubts & Paradoxes, Touching the Spagyrist's Principles Commonly call'd Hypostatical; As they are wont to be Propos'd and Defended by the Generality of Alchymists. Whereunto is præmis'd Part of another Discourse relating to the same Subject. Printed by J. Cadwell for J. Crooke.
