= Heat capacities of the elements (data page) =

Chemical data page

== Specific heat capacity ==
	J/(mol·K)	J/(g·K)
1 H hydrogen (H_{2}, gas)
use	28.836	14.304
CRC	28.836	14.304
WEL	28.82	
LNG	28.84	
2 He helium (gas)
use	20.786	5.193
CRC	20.786	5.193
WEL	20.786	
LNG	20.786	
3 Li lithium
use	24.860	3.582
CRC	24.860	3.582
WEL	24.8	
LNG	24.8	
4 Be beryllium
use	16.443	1.825
CRC	16.443	1.825
WEL	16.4	
LNG	16.38	
5 B boron (rhombic)
use	11.087	1.026
CRC	11.087	1.026
WEL	11.1	
LNG	11.1	
6 C carbon (graphite)
use	8.517	0.709
CRC	8.517	0.709
WEL	8.53	
LNG	8.517	
6 C carbon (diamond, nonstd state)
use	6.115	0.509
WEL	6.115	
LNG	6.116	
7 N nitrogen (N_{2}, gas)
use	29.124	1.040
CRC	29.124	1.040
WEL	29.12	
LNG	29.124	
8 O oxygen (O_{2}, gas)
use	29.378	0.918
CRC	29.378	0.918
WEL	29.4	
LNG	29.4	
9 F fluorine (F_{2}, gas)
use	31.304	0.824
CRC	31.304	0.824
WEL	31.3	
LNG	31.30	
10 Ne neon (gas)
use	20.786	1.030
CRC	20.786	1.030
WEL	20.786	
LNG	20.786	
11 Na sodium
use	28.230	1.228
CRC	28.230	1.228
WEL	28.2	
LNG	28.15	
12 Mg magnesium
use	24.869	1.023
CRC	24.869	1.023
WEL	24.9	
LNG	24.87	
13 Al aluminium
use	24.200	0.897
CRC	24.200	0.897
WEL	24.4	
LNG	24.4	
14 Si silicon
use	19.789	0.705
CRC	19.789	0.705
WEL	20.0	
LNG	20.00	
15 P phosphorus (white)
use	23.824	0.769
CRC	23.824	0.769
WEL	23.84	
LNG	23.83	
15 P phosphorus (red, nonstd state)
use	21.19	0.684
WEL	21.2	
LNG	21.19	
16 S sulfur (rhombic)
use	22.75	0.710
CRC	22.75	0.710
WEL	22.6	
LNG	22.60	
16 S sulfur (monoclinic, nonstd state)
use	23.23	0.724
LNG	23.23	
17 Cl chlorine (Cl_{2} gas)
use	33.949	0.479
CRC	33.949	0.479
WEL	33.91	
LNG	33.95	
18 Ar argon (gas)
use	20.786	0.520
CRC	20.786	0.520
WEL	20.786	
LNG	20.79	
19 K potassium
use	29.600	0.757
CRC	29.600	0.757
WEL	29.6	
LNG	29.60	
20 Ca calcium
use	25.929	0.647
CRC	25.929	0.647
WEL	25.3	
LNG	25.9	
21 Sc scandium
use	25.52	0.568
CRC	25.52	0.568
WEL	25.5	
LNG	25.52	
22 Ti titanium
use	25.060	0.523
CRC	25.060	0.523
WEL	25.0	
LNG	25.0	
23 V vanadium
use	24.89	0.489
CRC	24.89	0.489
WEL	24.9	
LNG	24.90	
24 Cr chromium
use	23.35	0.449
CRC	23.35	0.449
WEL	23.3	
LNG	23.43	
25 Mn manganese
use	26.32	0.479
CRC	26.32	0.479
WEL	26.3	
LNG	26.30	
26 Fe iron (alpha)
use	25.10	0.449
CRC	25.10	0.449
WEL	25.1	
LNG	25.09	
27 Co cobalt
use	24.81	0.421
CRC	24.81	0.421
WEL	24.8	
LNG	24.8	
28 Ni nickel
use	26.07	0.444
CRC	26.07	0.444
WEL	26.1	
LNG	26.1	
29 Cu copper
use	24.440	0.385
CRC	24.440	0.385
WEL	24.43	
LNG	24.44	
30 Zn zinc
use	25.390	0.388
CRC	25.390	0.388
WEL	25.4	
LNG	25.40	
31 Ga gallium
use	25.86	0.371
CRC	25.86	0.371
WEL	25.9	
LNG	26.06	
32 Ge germanium
use	23.222	0.320
CRC	23.222	0.320
WEL	23.35	
LNG	23.3	
33 As arsenic (alpha, gray)
use	24.64	0.329
CRC	24.64	0.329
WEL	24.6	
LNG	24.64	
34 Se selenium (hexagonal)
use	25.363	0.321
CRC	25.363	0.321
WEL	25.36	
LNG	24.98	
35 Br bromine
use	(Br_{2}) 75.69	0.474
CRC	36.057	0.226
WEL	(liquid) 75.69	
WEL	(Br_{2}, gas, nonstd state) 36.0	
LNG	(Br_{2}, liquid) 75.67	
36 Kr krypton (gas)
use	20.786	0.248
CRC	20.786	0.248
WEL	20.786	
LNG	20.786	
37 Rb rubidium
use	31.060	0.363
CRC	31.060	0.363
WEL	31.1	
LNG	31.06	
38 Sr strontium
use	26.4	0.301
CRC	26.4	0.301
WEL	26	
LNG	26.79	
39 Y yttrium
use	26.53	0.298
CRC	26.53	0.298
WEL	26.5	
LNG	26.51	
40 Zr zirconium
use	25.36	0.278
CRC	25.36	0.278
WEL	25.4	
LNG	25.40	
41 Nb niobium
use	24.60	0.265
CRC	24.60	0.265
WEL	24.6	
LNG	24.67	
42 Mo molybdenum
use	24.06	0.251
CRC	24.06	0.251
WEL	24.1	
LNG	24.13	
43 Tc technetium
use	24.27	
LNG	24.27	
44 Ru ruthenium
use	24.06	0.238
CRC	24.06	0.238
WEL	24.1	
LNG	24.1	
45 Rh rhodium
use	24.98	0.243
CRC	24.98	0.243
WEL	25.0	
LNG	24.98	
46 Pd palladium
use	25.98	0.244
CRC	25.98	0.246 [sic]
WEL	26.0	
LNG	25.94	
47 Ag silver
use	25.350	0.235
CRC	25.350	0.235
WEL	25.4	
LNG	25.4	
48 Cd cadmium
use	26.020	0.232
CRC	26.020	0.232
WEL	26.0	
LNG	25.9	
49 In indium
use	26.74	0.233
CRC	26.74	0.233
WEL	26.7	
LNG	26.7	
50 Sn tin (white)
use	27.112	0.228
CRC	27.112	0.228
WEL	27.0	
LNG	26.99	
50 Sn tin (gray, nonstd state)
use	25.77	0.217
WEL	25.8	
LNG	25.77	
51 Sb antimony
use	25.23	0.207
CRC	25.23	0.207
WEL	25.2	
LNG	25.2	
52 Te tellurium
use	25.73	0.202
CRC	25.73	0.202
WEL	25.7	
LNG	25.70	
53 I iodine
use	(I_{2}) 54.44	0.214
CRC	36.888	0.145
WEL	(solid) 54.44	
WEL	(I_{2}, gas, nonstd state) 36.9	
LNG	(I_{2}, solid) 54.44	
LNG	(I_{2}, gas, nonstd state) 36.86	
54 Xe xenon (gas)
use	20.786	0.158
CRC	20.786	0.158
WEL	20.786	
LNG	20.786	
55 Cs caesium
use	32.210	0.242
CRC	32.210	0.242
WEL	32.2	
LNG	32.20	
56 Ba barium
use	28.07	0.204
CRC	28.07	0.204
WEL	28.1	
LNG	28.10	
57 La lanthanum
use	27.11	0.195
CRC	27.11	0.195
WEL	27.1	
LNG	27.11	
58 Ce cerium (gamma, fcc)
use	26.94	0.192
CRC	26.94	0.192
WEL	26.9	
LNG	26.9	
59 Pr praseodymium
use	27.20	0.193
CRC	27.20	0.193
WEL	27.2	
LNG	27.20	
60 Nd neodymium
use	27.45	0.190
CRC	27.45	0.190
WEL	27.4	
LNG	27.5	
62 Sm samarium
use	29.54	0.197
CRC	29.54	0.197
WEL	29.5	
LNG	29.54	
63 Eu europium
use	27.66	0.182
CRC	27.66	0.182
WEL	27.7	
LNG	27.66	
64 Gd gadolinium
use	37.03	0.236
CRC	37.03	0.236
WEL	37.0	
LNG	37.03	
65 Tb terbium
use	28.91	0.182
CRC	28.91	0.182
WEL	28.9	
LNG	28.91	
66 Dy dysprosium
use	27.7	0.170
CRC	27.7	0.170
WEL	27.2	
LNG	27.7	
67 Ho holmium
use	27.15	0.165
CRC	27.15	0.165
WEL	27.2	
LNG	27.15	
68 Er erbium
use	28.12	0.168
CRC	28.12	0.168
WEL	28.1	
LNG	28.12	
69 Tm thulium
use	27.03	0.160
CRC	27.03	0.160
WEL	27.0	
LNG	27.03	
70 Yb ytterbium
use	26.74	0.155
CRC	26.74	0.155
WEL	26.7	
LNG	26.74	
71 Lu lutetium
use	26.86	0.154
CRC	26.86	0.154
WEL	26.9	
LNG	26.86	
72 Hf hafnium (hexagonal)
use	25.73	0.144
CRC	25.73	0.144
WEL	25.7	
LNG	25.69	
73 Ta tantalum
use	25.36	0.140
CRC	25.36	0.140
WEL	25.4	
LNG	25.40	
74 W tungsten
use	24.27	0.132
CRC	24.27	0.132
WEL	24.3	
LNG	24.3	
75 Re rhenium
use	25.48	0.137
CRC	25.48	0.137
WEL	25.5	
LNG	25.5	
76 Os osmium
use	24.7	0.130
CRC	24.7	0.130
WEL	25	
LNG	24.7	
77 Ir iridium
use	25.10	0.131
CRC	25.10	0.131
WEL	25.1	
LNG	25.06	
78 Pt platinum
use	25.86	0.133
CRC	25.86	0.133
WEL	25.9	
79 Au gold
use	25.418	0.129
CRC	25.418	0.129
WEL	25.42	
LNG	25.36	
80 Hg mercury (liquid)
use	27.983	0.140
CRC	27.983	0.140
WEL	27.98	
LNG	28.00	
81 Tl thallium
use	26.32	0.129
CRC	26.32	0.129
WEL	26.3	
LNG	26.32	
82 Pb lead
use	26.650	0.129
CRC	26.650	0.129
WEL	26.4	
LNG	26.84	
83 Bi bismuth
use	25.52	0.122
CRC	25.52	0.122
WEL	25.5	
LNG	25.5	
84 Po polonium
use	26.4	
LNG	26.4	
86 Rn radon (gas)
use	20.786	0.094
CRC	20.786	0.094
WEL	20.79	
LNG	20.79	
87 Fr francium
use	31.80	
LNG	31.80	
89 Ac actinium
use	27.2	0.120
CRC	27.2	0.120
WEL	27.2	
LNG	27.2	
90 Th thorium
use	26.230	0.113
CRC	26.230	0.113
WEL	27.3	
LNG	27.32	
92 U uranium
use	27.665	0.116
CRC	27.665	0.116
WEL	27.7	
LNG	27.66	
93 Np neptunium
use	29.46	
LNG	29.46	
94 Pu plutonium
use	35.5	
LNG	35.5	
95 Am americium
use	62.7	
LNG	62.7	

== Notes ==
- All values refer to 25 °C and to the thermodynamically stable standard state at that temperature unless noted.
- Values from CRC refer to "100 kPa (1 bar or 0.987 standard atmospheres)". Lange indirectly defines the values to be standard atmosphere of "1 atm (101325 Pa)", although citing the same NBS and JANAF sources among others. It is assumed this inexactly refers to "ambient pressure".
