= Roles of chemical elements =

This table is designed to show the role(s) performed by each chemical element, in nature and in technology.

Z = Atomic number Sym. = Symbol Per. = Period Gr. = Group

Z	Sym.	Element	Per.	Gr.	Role(s) in nature (non-living and living)	Role(s) in technology (old and new)
1	H	Hydrogen	1	1	Astronomy: source of power by nuclear fusion (proton–proton chain reaction and CNO cycle); Biology: One of the most common elements in living organisms	Petrochemical industry: hydrodealkylation, hydrodesulfurization Various industries: hydrogenation
2	He	Helium	1	18	Astronomy: source of power by nuclear fusion (alpha process and triple-alpha process)	Various industries: cryogenics, pressurization, controlled atmosphere, welding
3	Li	Lithium	2	1	Geology: occurs in pegmatites and brines; trace element in some organisms; possible role in mood regulation in animals	Ceramics and glass: flux, component of ovenware Electricity and electronics: batteries Various industries: lubricating greases Nuclear industry: tritium production for fusion reactors
4	Be	Beryllium	2	2	Geology: occurs in beryl and chrysoberyl minerals; no known biological role; toxic to most organisms	Radiography: radiation windows Aeronautics and astronautics: lightweight structural components Electronics: copper–beryllium alloys for springs and connectors Nuclear industry: neutron reflector and moderator
5	B	Boron	2	13	Plants: essential micronutrient for cell wall formation and pollen germination Geology: found in evaporite deposits (borax, kernite)	Ceramics and glass: borosilicate glass Cleaning products: detergents and bleaches Insecticides: boric acid Electronics: semiconductors
6	C	Carbon	2	14	Biology: One of the most common elements in living organisms See also: Carbon-based life	Fossil fuels: coal, methane and petroleum Textile industry: cellulose Metallurgy: alloys, especially carbon steel
7	N	Nitrogen	2	15	Bacteria and archaea: nitrogen fixation by diazotrophs All forms of life on Earth: essential component of amino acids and of nucleic acids Earth's atmosphere, soil, and life forms: nitrogen cycle See also: CHON.	Chemical industry: nitrogen fixation by the Haber process Astronautics: nitric acid and hydrazine
8	O	Oxygen	2	16	Animals: inhaled in respiration Plants: exhaled in respiration; Biology: one of the most common elements in living organisms	Metallurgy: smelting of iron ore into steel Chemical industry: ethylene + O_{2} —> ethylene oxide —> ethylene glycol —> many products Medicine; Water treatment
9	F	Fluorine	2	17	Animals: component of tooth enamel (fluorapatite); toxic in excess	Various industries: fluorocarbons and derivatives as refrigerants and as anaesthetics Water treatment: fluoridation to prevent dental caries Aluminium production: cryolite as solvent
10	Ne	Neon	2	18		Signage: neon signs Electronics: vacuum tubes
11	Na	Sodium	3	1	See also: Sodium in biology.	Chemical industry: manufacture of sodium hydroxide and sodium carbonate (Solvay process); Metallurgy: reduction of refractory metals (titanium, zirconium); Street lighting: high-pressure sodium lamps Nuclear industry: liquid sodium coolant in fast breeder reactors Food industry: table salt (NaCl), food preservative
12	Mg	Magnesium	3	2	All life forms: essential catalyst for using and making DNA and RNA; Plants: photosynthesis See also: Magnesium in biology.	Metallurgy: aluminium alloys, production of iron, steel, and titanium Automotive industry: lightweight components Electronics
13	Al	Aluminium	3	13		Construction and packaging: structural alloys, beverage cans, foil Aeronautics: lightweight airframe alloys Electrical industry: overhead power transmission cables Metallurgy: aluminothermic reduction (thermite); Optics: mirror coatings Chemistry: aluminium oxide (alumina) as refractory and abrasive
14	Si	Silicon	3	14	Earth's crust: silicate minerals Diatoms, radiolaria, and siliceous sponges: biogenic silica as a structural material	Construction: Portland cement, concrete Electronics: semiconductors
15	P	Phosphorus	3	15	Biology: structure of DNA and RNA part of adenosine triphosphate (ATP) structure of bones and teeth	Agriculture: fertilizers
16	S	Sulfur	3	16	Biology: part of the amino acids cysteine and methionine, and of all polypeptides, proteins, and enzymes that contain them See also: Sulfur assimilation.	Agriculture: fertilizers, fungicides, and pesticides
17	Cl	Chlorine	3	17		
18	Ar	Argon	3	18		
19	K	Potassium	4	1	Animals: neuron function, electrolyte balance See also: Potassium in biology.	Agriculture: fertilizers
20	Ca	Calcium	4	2	Animals: structure of bones and teeth See also: Calcium in biology.	Construction: cements and mortars
21	Sc	Scandium	4	3		
22	Ti	Titanium	4	4		
23	V	Vanadium	4	5		
24	Cr	Chromium	4	6		
25	Mn	Manganese	4	7		
26	Fe	Iron	4	8		
27	Co	Cobalt	4	9		
28	Ni	Nickel	4	10		
29	Cu	Copper	4	11	See also: Copper in health.	
30	Zn	Zinc	4	12		
31	Ga	Gallium	4	13		
32	Ge	Germanium	4	14		
33	As	Arsenic	4	15	See also: Arsenic biochemistry.	
34	Se	Selenium	4	16		
35	Br	Bromine	4	17		
36	Kr	Krypton	4	18		
37	Rb	Rubidium	5	1		
38	Sr	Strontium	5	2		
39	Y	Yttrium	5	3		
40	Zr	Zirconium	5	4		
41	Nb	Niobium	5	5		
42	Mo	Molybdenum	5	6		
43	Tc	Technetium	5	7		
44	Ru	Ruthenium	5	8		
45	Rh	Rhodium	5	9		
46	Pd	Palladium	5	10		
47	Ag	Silver	5	11		
48	Cd	Cadmium	5	12		
49	In	Indium	5	13		
50	Sn	Tin	5	14		
51	Sb	Antimony	5	15		
52	Te	Tellurium	5	16		
53	I	Iodine	5	17	See also: Iodine in biology.	
54	Xe	Xenon	5	18		
55	Cs	Caesium	6	1		
56	Ba	Barium	6	2		
57	La	Lanthanum	6	3		
58	Ce	Cerium	6	3		
59	Pr	Praseodymium	6	3		
60	Nd	Neodymium	6	3		
61	Pm	Promethium	6	3		
62	Sm	Samarium	6	3		
63	Eu	Europium	6	3		
64	Gd	Gadolinium	6	3		
65	Tb	Terbium	6	3		
66	Dy	Dysprosium	6	3		
67	Ho	Holmium	6	3		
68	Er	Erbium	6	3		
69	Tm	Thulium	6	3		
70	Yb	Ytterbium	6	3		
71	Lu	Lutetium	6	3		
72	Hf	Hafnium	6	4		
73	Ta	Tantalum	6	5		
74	W	Tungsten	6	6		
75	Re	Rhenium	6	7		
76	Os	Osmium	6	8		
77	Ir	Iridium	6	9		
78	Pt	Platinum	6	10		
79	Au	Gold	6	11		
80	Hg	Mercury	6	12		
81	Tl	Thallium	6	13		
82	Pb	Lead	6	14		
83	Bi	Bismuth	6	15		
84	Po	Polonium	6	16		
85	At	Astatine	6	17		
86	Rn	Radon	6	18		
87	Fr	Francium	7	1		
88	Ra	Radium	7	2		
89	Ac	Actinium	7	3		
90	Th	Thorium	7	3		
91	Pa	Protactinium	7	3		
92	U	Uranium	7	3		
93	Np	Neptunium	7	3		
94	Pu	Plutonium	7	3		
95	Am	Americium	7	3		
96	Cm	Curium	7	3		
97	Bk	Berkelium	7	3		
98	Cf	Californium	7	3		
99	Es	Einsteinium	7	3		
100	Fm	Fermium	7	3		
101	Md	Mendelevium	7	3		
102	No	Nobelium	7	3		
103	Lr	Lawrencium	7	3		
104	Rf	Rutherfordium	7	4		
105	Db	Dubnium	7	5		
106	Sg	Seaborgium	7	6		
107	Bh	Bohrium	7	7		
108	Hs	Hassium	7	8		
109	Mt	Meitnerium	7	9		
110	Ds	Darmstadtium	7	10		
111	Rg	Roentgenium	7	11		
112	Cn	Copernicium	7	12		
113	Nh	Nihonium	7	13		
114	Fl	Flerovium	7	14		
115	Mc	Moscovium	7	15		
116	Lv	Livermorium	7	16		
117	Ts	Tennessine	7	17		
118	Og	Oganesson	7	18		

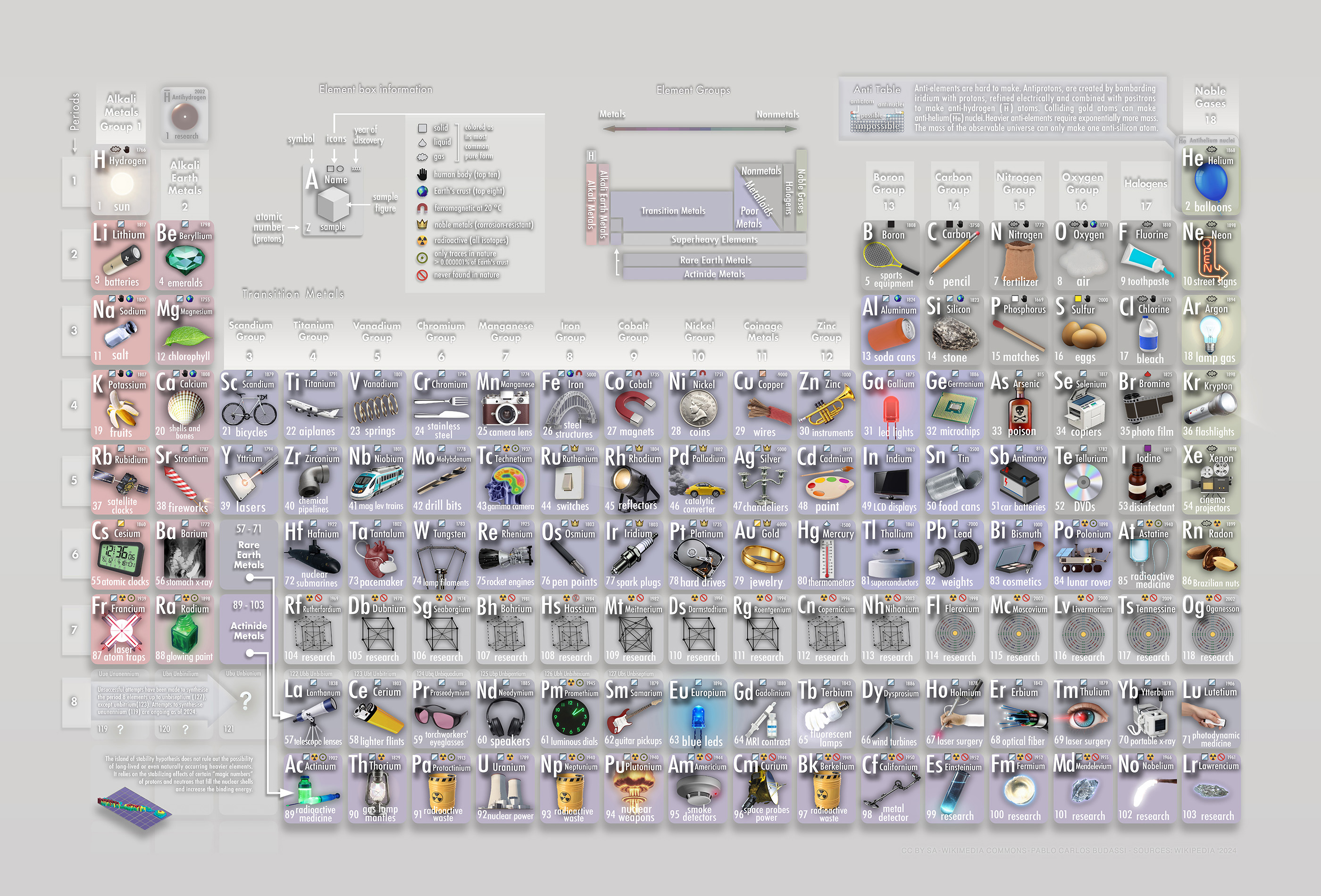
Table of elements showing examples of everyday objects that contain each element.

== See also ==
- Abundance of the chemical elements
- Dietary mineral
