= Spin model =

Mathematical model used to explain magnetism

A spin model is a mathematical model used in physics primarily to explain magnetism. Spin models may either be classical or quantum mechanical in nature. Spin models have been studied in quantum field theory as examples of integrable models. Spin models are also used in quantum information theory and computability theory in theoretical computer science. The theory of spin models is a far reaching and unifying topic that cuts across many fields.

== Introduction ==
In ordinary materials, the magnetic dipole moments of individual atoms produce magnetic fields that cancel one another, because each dipole points in a random direction. Ferromagnetic materials below their Curie temperature, however, exhibit magnetic domains in which the atomic dipole moments are locally aligned, producing a macroscopic, non-zero magnetic field from the domain. These are the ordinary "magnets" with which we are all familiar.

The study of the behavior of such "spin models" is a thriving area of research in condensed matter physics. For instance, the Ising model describes spins (dipoles) that have only two possible states, up and down, whereas in the Heisenberg model the spin vector is allowed to point in any direction. In certain magnets, the magnetic dipoles are only free to rotate in a 2D plane, a system which can be adequately described by the so-called xy-model.

The lack of a unified theory of magnetism forces scientist to model magnetic systems theoretically with one, or a combination of these spin models in order to understand the intricate behavior of atomic magnetic interactions. Numerical implementation of these models has led to several interesting results, such as quantitative research in the theory of phase transitions.

== Quantum ==
A quantum spin model is a quantum Hamiltonian model that describes a system which consists of spins either interacting or not and are an active area of research in the fields of strongly correlated electron systems, quantum information theory, and quantum computing. The physical observables in these quantum models are actually operators in a Hilbert space acting on state vectors as opposed to the physical observables in the corresponding classical spin models - like the Ising model - which are commutative variables.

== See also ==
- ANNNI model
- Bethe ansatz
- Ising model
- Classical Heisenberg model
- Quantum Heisenberg model
- Hubbard model
- J1 J2 model
- Kuramoto model
- Magnetism
- Majumdar–Ghosh model
- Potts model
- t-J model
- Quantum rotor model
- Spin
- Spin stiffness
- Spin waves
- XY model
- Yang–Baxter equation
- Z N model

== Bibliography ==
- Bethe, H. (March 1931). "Zur Theorie der Metalle". Zeitschrift für Physik. 71 (3–4): 205–226. Bibcode:1931ZPhy...71..205B. doi:10.1007/BF01341708. S2CID 124225487.
- R.J. Baxter, Exactly solved models in statistical mechanics, London, Academic Press, 1982
- Affleck, Ian; Marston, J. Brad (1 March 1988). "Large-n limit of the Heisenberg-Hubbard model: Implications for high-Tc superconductors". Physical Review B. 37 (7): 3774–3777. Bibcode:1988PhRvB..37.3774A. doi:10.1103/PhysRevB.37.3774. PMID 9944997.
