= Superfluid film =

Thin layer of liquid in a superfluid state

Superfluidity is a phenomenon where a fluid, or a fraction of a fluid, loses all its viscosity and can flow without resistance. A superfluid film is the thin film it may then form as a result.

Superfluid helium, for example, forms a 30-nanometre film on the surface of any container. The film's properties cause the helium to climb the walls of the container and, if this is not closed, flow out.

Superfluidity, like superconductivity, is a macroscopic manifestation of quantum mechanics. There is considerable interest, both theoretical and practical, in these quantum phase transitions. There has been a tremendous amount of work done in the field of phase transitions and critical phenomena in two dimensions. Much of the interest in this field is because as the number of dimensions increases, the number of exactly solvable models diminishes drastically. In three or more dimensions one must resort to a mean field theory approach. The theory of superfluid transitions in two dimensions is known as the Kosterlitz-Thouless (KT) theory. The 2D XY model - where the order parameter is characterized by an amplitude and a phase - is the universality class for this transition.

== Experimental techniques ==
=== Maximising the film's area ===
In looking at phase transitions in thin films, specifically helium, the two main experimental signatures are the superfluid fraction and heat capacity. If either of these measurements were to be done on a superfluid film in a typical open container, the film signal would be overwhelmed by the background signal from the container. Therefore, when studying superfluid films, it is of paramount importance to study a system of large surface area as to enhance the film signal. There are several ways of doing this. In the first, a long thin strip of material such as PET film is rolled up into a "jelly roll" configuration. The result is a film that is a long continuous plane, referred to as a planar film. A second way is to have a highly porous material such as porous gold, Vycor, or Aerogel. This results in a multiply connected film where the substrate is much like Swiss cheese with the holes interconnected. These porous materials all have an extremely high surface area to volume ratio. A third method is to separate two extremely flat plates by a thin spacer, again resulting in a large surface area to volume ratio.

| Material | Surface area (m^{2}/g) | Pore size (nm) |
|---|---|---|
| Vycor glass | 250 | 4 |
| Porous gold | 100-200 | 100 |
| Aerogel | 200-1000 | 20 |

Scanning electron microscope image of porous gold, 10 micrometres square

=== Measuring the superfluid fraction ===
Torsional oscillator using a single fin.

The film's superfluid response can be measured by using a torsional oscillator to measure the moment of inertia of a cell containing it. The oscillator comprises a torsion rod to which the cell is attached, together with an arrangement for oscillating the cell at its resonant frequency around the rod's axis. A higher resonant frequency corresponds to a lower moment of inertia.

Any superfluid fraction of the film loses its viscosity, and therefore doesn't participate in the oscillations. This means it no longer contributes to the cell's moment of inertia, and the resonant frequency increases.

The oscillation is achieved via capacitive coupling with a fin or pair of fins, depending on the configuration. (The arrangement in the diagram uses one fin, shown in grey.)

An early design of torsional oscillator was first used by Andronikashvili to detect superfluid in bulk fluid ^{4}He, and later modified by John Reppy and co-workers at Cornell in the 1970s.

Recall that the resonant period of a torsional oscillator is $2\pi\sqrt{m/k}$. Therefore, lowering the moment of inertia reduces the resonant period of the oscillator. By measuring the period drop as a function of temperature, and total loading of the film from the empty cell value, one can deduce the fraction of the film that has entered the superfluid state. A typical set of data clearly showing the superfluid decoupling in helium films is shown in ref. 2.

=== Measurements at higher velocities ===
A typical torsional oscillator has a resonant frequency on the order of 1000 Hz. This corresponds to a maximum velocity of the substrate of micrometres per second. The critical velocity of helium films is reported to be on the order of 0.1 m/s . Therefore, in comparison to the critical velocity, the oscillator is almost at rest. To probe theories of dynamical aspects of thin film phase transitions one must use an oscillator with a much higher frequency. The quartz crystal microbalance provides just such a tool having a resonant frequency of about 10 kHz. The operating principles are much the same as for a torsional oscillator. When the thin film is adsorbed onto the surface of the crystal, the resonant frequency of the quartz crystal drops. As the crystal is cooled through the superfluid transition, the superfluid decouples and the frequency increases.

== Some results ==
The KT theory has been confirmed in a set of experiments by Bishop and Reppy in planar films, i.e. Helium films on mylar . Specifically, they found that the transition temperature scaled with film thickness and the superfluid transition is found in films as thin as 5% of a monolayer. More recently, it has been found that near the transition temperature when the correlation lengths exceed any relevant length scale in the system, a multiply connected film will behave as a 3D system near its critical point.

== See also ==
- Bose–Einstein condensate
- Quantum vortex
- Supersolid
