= Supersolid =

State of matter

In condensed matter physics, a supersolid is a spatially ordered (i.e. solid) material with superfluid properties. In the case of helium-4, it has been conjectured since the 1960s that it might be possible to create a supersolid.

Starting from 2017, a definitive proof for the existence of this state was provided by several experiments using atomic Bose–Einstein condensates. The general conditions required for supersolidity to emerge in a certain substance are a topic of ongoing research.

== Background ==
A supersolid is a special quantum state of matter where particles form a rigid, spatially ordered structure, but also flow with zero viscosity. This is in contradiction to the intuition that flow, and in particular superfluid flow with zero viscosity, is a property exclusive to the fluid state, e.g., superconducting electron and neutron fluids, gases with Bose–Einstein condensates, or unconventional liquids such as helium-4 or helium-3 at sufficiently low temperature.

For more than 50 years it was thus unclear whether the supersolid state could exist.

== Superglass ==
A superglass is a similar hypothetical phase of matter which is characterized by superfluidity and a frozen amorphous structure at the same time. This idea was put forward by Anthony James Leggett in 1970. In 2009, it was theorised that frozen helium-4 (at 0.2 K and 50 atm) may be a superglass.

== Experiments using helium ==
In the 1980s, the first anomaly in a solid was discovered by using ultrasound. Further research detected supersolid behavior in 2004. Specifically, a non-classical rotational moment of inertia of a torsional oscillator was observed. This observation could not be explained by classical models but was consistent with superfluid-like behavior of a small percentage of the helium atoms contained within the oscillator.

This observation triggered a large number of follow-up studies to reveal the role played by crystal defects or helium-3 impurities. Further experimentation has cast some doubt on the existence of a true supersolid in helium. Most importantly, it was shown that the observed phenomena could be largely explained due to changes in the elastic properties of the helium. In 2012, the experiments that detected supersolid-like behavior in 2004 were repeated to eliminate any such contributions. No supersolid behavior was found in the repeated experiments.

== Experiments using ultracold quantum gases ==
In 2017, supersolid properties were created in ultracold quantum gases via different methods. One placed a Bose–Einstein condensate inside two optical resonators, which enhanced the atomic interactions until they started to spontaneously crystallize and form a solid that maintains the inherent superfluidity of Bose–Einstein condensates. This setting realises a special form of a supersolid, the so-called lattice supersolid, where atoms are pinned to the sites of an externally imposed lattice structure.

The other method exposed a Bose–Einstein condensate in a double-well potential to light beams that created an effective spin–orbit coupling. The interference between the atoms on the two spin–orbit coupled lattice sites gave rise to a characteristic density modulation.

In 2019, supersolid properties in dipolar Bose–Einstein condensates formed from lanthanide atoms were independently observed by three research groups. In these systems, supersolidity emerges directly from the atomic interactions, without the need for an external optical lattice. This also allowed the direct observation of superfluid flow and hence the definitive proof for the existence of the supersolid state of matter.

In 2021, confocal cavity quantum electrodynamics with a Bose–Einstein condensate was used to create a supersolid that possesses a key property of solids, vibration. That is, a supersolid was created that possesses lattice phonons with a Goldstone mode dispersion exhibiting a 16 cm/s (6.3 in/s) speed of sound.

In 2021, dysprosium was used to create a 2-dimensional supersolid quantum gas. In 2022, the same team created a supersolid disk in a round trap and in 2024 they reported the observation of quantum vortices in the supersolid phase.

In 2026, a research group was able to create a supersolid at room temperature using perovskite crystals and exciton-polariton nanograting.

== Theory ==
In most theories of this state, it is supposed that vacancies – empty sites normally occupied by particles in an ideal crystal – lead to supersolidity. These vacancies are caused by zero-point energy, which also causes them to move from site to site as waves. Because vacancies are bosons, if such clouds of vacancies can exist at very low temperatures, then a Bose–Einstein condensation of vacancies could occur at temperatures less than a few tenths of a Kelvin. A coherent flow of vacancies is equivalent to a "superflow" (frictionless flow) of particles in the opposite direction. Despite the presence of the gas of vacancies, the ordered structure of a crystal is maintained, although with less than one particle on each lattice site on average. Alternatively, a supersolid can also emerge from a superfluid. In this situation, which is realised in the experiments with atomic Bose–Einstein condensates, the spatially ordered structure is a modulation on top of the superfluid density distribution.

== See also ==
- Superfluid film
- Quasi-solid
