= Lambda transition =

Group in condensed matter physics

The λ (lambda) universality class is a group in condensed matter physics. It regroups several systems possessing strong analogies, namely, superfluids, superconductors and smectics (liquid crystals). All these systems are expected to belong to the same universality class for the thermodynamic critical properties of the phase transition. While these systems are quite different at the first glance, they all are described by similar formalisms and their typical phase diagrams are identical.

== See also ==
- Superfluid
- Superconductor
- Liquid crystal
- Phase transition
- Renormalization group
- Topological defect
