= Universality class =

Collection of models with the same renormalization group flow limit

In statistical mechanics, an universality class is a set of mathematical models which share a scale-invariant limit under renormalization group flow. While the models within a class may differ at finite scales, their behaviour become increasingly similar as the limit scale is approached. In particular, asymptotic phenomena such as critical exponents are the same for all models in the class.

Well-studied examples include the universality classes of the Ising model or the percolation theory at their respective phase transition points; these are both families of classes, one for each lattice dimension. Typically, a family of universality classes has a lower and upper critical dimension: below the lower critical dimension, the universality class becomes degenerate (this dimension is 2 for the Ising model, or for directed percolation, but 1 for undirected percolation), and above the upper critical dimension $d^*$ the critical exponents stabilize and can be calculated by an analog of mean-field theory (this dimension is $d^*=4$ for Ising or for directed percolation, and 6 for undirected percolation).

== Definition of critical exponents ==
Critical exponents characterize the variation of certain physical properties of the system as the control parameter approaches the critical point. For temperature-driven transitions, one usually defines the reduced temperature $\tau = (T-T_c)/T_c$, and for small $|\tau|$ various observables follow power laws of $\tau$:

- The exponent $\alpha$ is the exponent relating the specific heat C to the reduced temperature: we have $C = \tau^{-\alpha}$. The specific heat will usually be singular at the critical point, but the minus sign in the definition of $\alpha$ allows it to remain positive.
- The exponent $\beta$ relates the order parameter $\Psi$ to the temperature. Unlike most critical exponents, it is assumed to be positive, since the order parameter will usually be zero at the critical point. So we have $\Psi = |\tau|^{\beta}$.
- The exponent $\gamma$ relates the temperature with the system's response to an external driving force, or source field. We have $d\Psi/dJ = \tau^{-\gamma}$, with J the driving force.
- The exponent $\delta$ relates the order parameter to the source field at the critical temperature, where this relationship becomes non-linear. We have $J = \Psi^\delta$ (hence $\Psi = J^{1/\delta}$), with the same meanings as before.
- The exponent $\nu$ relates the size of correlations (i.e. patches of the ordered phase) to the temperature; away from the critical point these are characterized by a correlation length $\xi$. We have $\xi = \tau^{-\nu}$.
- The exponent $\eta$ measures the size of correlations at the critical temperature. It is defined so that the correlation function of the order parameter scales as $r^{-d+2-\eta}$.
- The exponent $\sigma$, used in percolation theory, measures the size of the largest clusters (roughly, the largest ordered blocks) at 'temperatures' (connection probabilities) below the critical point. So $s_{\max} \sim (p_c - p)^{-1/\sigma}$.
- The exponent $\tau$, also from percolation theory, measures the number of size s clusters far from $s_{\max}$ (or the number of clusters at criticality): $n_s \sim s^{-\tau} f(s/s_{\max})$, with the $f$ factor removed at critical probability.

The critical exponents are independent of microscopic details of the model, but depend on dimensionality, symmetry, and range of interactions (i.e., only depend on the universality class). In rare cases, the critical exponents governing the behaviors below and above the critical point are not the same.

== List of critical exponents ==
For symmetries, the group listed gives the symmetry of the order parameter. The group $\mathrm{S}_n$ is the n-element symmetric group, $O(n)$ is the orthogonal group in n dimensions, $\mathbb{Z}_2$ is the cyclic group of order 2 (parity, or Ising symmetry), and 1 is the trivial group. Mean-field theory result is indicated with (MF). In the two-dimensional Ashkin-Teller model, the exponents in general depend continuously on a parameter along the critical line. The spherical model can be viewed as the $n\to\infty$ limit of the $O(n)$ symmetry.

Class	Dimension	Symmetry	$\alpha$	$\beta$	$\gamma$	$\delta$	$\nu$	$\eta$
3-state Potts	2	$\mathrm{S}_3$	1/3	1/9	13/9	14	5/6	4/15
Ashkin–Teller (at 4-state Potts point)	2	$\mathrm{S} _4$	2/3	1/12	7/6	15	2/3	1/4
Ordinary percolation	1	1	1	0	1	$\infty$	1	1
Ordinary percolation	2	1	−2/3	5/36	43/18	91/5	4/3	5/24
Ordinary percolation	3	1	−0.625(3)	0.4181(8)	1.793(3)	5.29(6)	0.87619(12)	0.46(8) or 0.59(9)
Ordinary percolation	4	1	−0.756(40)	0.657(9)	1.422(16)	3.9 or 3.198(6)	0.689(10)	−0.0944(28)
Ordinary percolation	5	1	≈ −0.85	0.830(10)	1.185(5)	3.0	0.569(5)	−0.075(20) or −0.0565
Ordinary percolation	6^{+} (MF)	1	−1	1	1	2	1/2	0
Directed percolation	1	1	0.159464(6)	0.276486(8)	2.277730(5)	0.159464(6)	1.096854(4)	0.313686(8)
Directed percolation	2	1	0.451	0.536(3)	1.60	0.451	0.733(8)	0.230
Directed percolation	3	1	0.73	0.813(9)	1.25	0.73	0.584(5)	0.12
Directed percolation	4^{+} (MF)	1	1	1	1	1	1/2	0
Conserved directed percolation (Manna, or "local linear interface")	1	1		0.28(1)		0.14(1)	1.11(2)	0.34(2)
Conserved directed percolation (Manna, or "local linear interface")	2	1		0.64(1)	1.59(3)	0.50(5)	1.29(8)	0.29(5)
Conserved directed percolation (Manna, or "local linear interface")	3	1		0.84(2)	1.23(4)	0.90(3)	1.12(8)	0.16(5)
Conserved directed percolation (Manna, or "local linear interface")	4^{+} (MF)	1		1	1	1	1	0
Protected percolation	2	1		5/41	86/41			
Protected percolation	3	1		0.28871(15)	1.3066(19)			
Ising	2	$\mathbb{Z}_2$	0	1/8	7/4	15	1	1/4
Ising	3	$\mathbb{Z}_2$	0.11008708(35)	0.32641871(75)	1.23707551(26)	4.78984254(27)	0.62997097(12)	0.036297612(48)
Ising	4^{+} (MF)	$\mathbb{Z}_2$	0	1/2	1	3	1/2	0
XY	2	—	Berezinskii-Kosterlitz-Thouless universality class					
XY	3	$O(2)$	−0.01526(30)	0.34869(7)	1.3179(2)	4.77937(25)	0.67175(10)	0.038176(44)
XY	4^{+} (MF)	$O(2)$	0	1/2	1	3	1/2	0
Heisenberg	3	$O(3)$	−0.1336⁢(15)	0.3689⁢(3)	1.3960⁢(9)	4.783⁢(3)	0.7112⁢(5)	0.0375⁢(5)
Heisenberg	4^{+} (MF)	$O(3)$	0	1/2	1	3	1/2	0
spherical	$2<d<4$	$O(\infty)$	$\frac{d-4}{d-2}$	1/2	$\frac{2}{d-2}$	$\frac{d+2}{d-2}$	$\frac{1}{d-2}$	0
spherical	4^{+} (MF)	$O(\infty)$	0	1/2	1	3	1/2	0
Self-avoiding walk	1	1	1	0	1	$\infty$	1	1
Self-avoiding walk	2	1	1/2	5/64	43/32	91/5	3/4	5/24
Self-avoiding walk	3	1	0.2372090(12)	0.3029190(8)	1.1569530(10)	4.819348(15)	0.5875970(4)	0.0310434(21)
Self-avoiding walk	4^{+} (MF)	1	0	1/2	1	3	1/2	0

=== Ising model ===
This section lists the critical exponents of the ferromagnetic transition in the Ising model. In statistical physics, the Ising model is the simplest system exhibiting a continuous phase transition with a scalar order parameter and $\mathbb{Z}_2$ symmetry. The critical exponents of the transition are universal values and characterize the singular properties of physical quantities. The ferromagnetic transition of the Ising model establishes an important universality class, which contains a variety of phase transitions as different as ferromagnetism close to the Curie point and critical opalescence of liquid near its critical point.

	d=2	d=3	d=4	general expression
α	0	0.11008708(35)	0	$2-d/(d-\Delta_\epsilon)$
β	1/8	0.32641871(75)	1/2	$\Delta_\sigma/(d-\Delta_\epsilon)$
γ	7/4	1.23707551(26)	1	$(d-2\Delta_\sigma)/(d-\Delta_\epsilon)$
δ	15	4.78984254(27)	3	$(d-\Delta_\sigma)/\Delta_\sigma$
η	1/4	0.036297612(48)	0	$2\Delta_\sigma - d+2$
ν	1	0.62997097(12)	1/2	$1/(d-\Delta_\epsilon)$
ω	2	0.82966(9)	0	$\Delta_{\epsilon'}-d$

From the quantum field theory point of view, the critical exponents can be expressed in terms of scaling dimensions of the local operators $\sigma,\epsilon,\epsilon'$ of the conformal field theory describing the phase transition (In the Ginzburg–Landau description, these are the operators normally called $\phi,\phi^2,\phi^4$.) These expressions are given in the last column of the above table, and were used to calculate the values of the critical exponents using the operator dimensions values from the following table:

	d=2	d=3	d=4
$\Delta_\sigma$	1/8	0.518148806(24)	1
$\Delta_\epsilon$	1	1.41262528(29)	2
$\Delta_{\epsilon'}$	4	3.82966(9)	4

In d=2, the two-dimensional critical Ising model's critical exponents can be computed exactly using the minimal model $M_{3,4}$. In d=4, it is the free massless scalar theory (also referred to as mean field theory). These two theories are exactly solved, and the exact solutions give values reported in the table.

The d=3 theory is not yet exactly solved. The most accurate results come from the conformal bootstrap. These are the values reported in the tables. Renormalization group methods, Monte-Carlo simulations, and the fuzzy sphere regulator give results in agreement with the conformal bootstrap, but are several orders of magnitude less accurate.

== Berezinskii-Kosterlitz-Thouless universality class ==
The phase transition present in the two-dimensional XY model and superconductors is governed by a distinct universality class, the Berezinskii–Kosterlitz–Thouless transition. The disordered phase (high-temperature phase) contains free vortices, while the ordered phase (low-temperature phase) contains bound vortices. At the phase transition, the free energy and all its derivatives are continuous, hence it is an infinite-order transition in the Ehrenfest classification.

The thermodynamic quantities do not show power-law singularities, as they do in second-order phase transitions. Instead, above the critical point $(T > T_c)$, the correlation length scales as $\xi \sim \exp(b |T-T_c|^{-\nu})$, where $b$ is a constant and $\nu = 1/2$. Susceptibility is then $\chi \sim \xi^{2-\eta(T)}$, where $\eta(T)$ depends on the temperature (and $\eta(T_c)=1/4$). Specific heat is finite at $T_c$. The two-point correlation function scales as $G(r) \sim r^{-\eta(T)}$ for $T<T_c$, while it behaves as $G(r) \sim \exp(-r/\xi)$ for $T>T_c$.

== Growth phenomena ==
In epitaxial growth, there is a change in the roughness of surfaces, from atomically flat to rough. The root mean square fluctuation in the evolving surface height (which characterizes roughness) increases as $w(t)\sim t^\beta$ initially, and eventually saturates at a size-dependent value $w(L)\sim L^\alpha$. $\beta$ is called the growth exponent, and $\alpha$ is the roughness exponent. The crossover time between the two regimes depends on the system size as $t_x \sim L^z$, where $z$ is the dynamical exponent obeying the scaling law $z=\alpha/\beta$. The Arcetri model (with an upper critical dimension $d^*=2$) stands between the Edwards-Wilkinson and Kardar-Parisi-Zhang equations analogously to the place of the spherical model between mean-field-theory and the Ising model.

class	dimensionality	$\alpha$	$\beta$	$z$
Edwards-Wilkinson (EW)	$d$	$\frac{2-d}{2}$	$\frac{2-d}{4}$	$2$
Arcetri	$d<2$	$\frac{2-d}{2}$	$\frac{2-d}{4}$	$2$
Arcetri	$d>2$	$0$	$0$	$2$
Kardar-Parisi-Zhang (KPZ)	$1$	$\frac{1}{2}$	$\frac{1}{3}$	$\frac{3}{2}$
Kardar-Parisi-Zhang (KPZ)	$2$	$0.390(3)$	$0.242(2)$	$1.610(3)$
Kardar-Parisi-Zhang (KPZ)	$3$	$0.314(6)$	$0.186(4)$	$1.686(6)$
Mullins-Herring (MH)	$d$	$\frac{4-d}{2}$	$\frac{4-d}{8}$	$4$
Molecular-beam epitaxy (MBE)	$d$	$\frac{4-d}{3}$	$\frac{4-d}{8+d}$	$\frac{8+d}{3}$

For a list of experimentally measured values of these exponents, one might consult.
