= Rushbrooke inequality =

In statistical mechanics, the Rushbrooke inequality relates the critical exponents of a magnetic system which exhibits a first-order phase transition in the thermodynamic limit for non-zero temperature T.

Since the Helmholtz free energy is extensive, the normalization to free energy per site is given as

$$f = -kT \lim_{N \rightarrow \infty} \frac{1}{N}\log Z_N$$

The magnetization M per site in the thermodynamic limit, depending on the external magnetic field H and temperature T is given by

$$M(T,H) \ \stackrel{\mathrm{def}}{=}\   \lim_{N \rightarrow \infty} \frac{1}{N} \left( \sum_i \sigma_i \right)$$

where $\sigma_i$ is the spin at the i-th site, and the magnetic susceptibility and specific heat at constant temperature and field are given by, respectively

$$\chi_T(T,H) = \left( \frac{\partial M}{\partial H} \right)_T$$

and

$$c_H = T \left( \frac{\partial S}{\partial T} \right)_H.$$

Additionally,

$$c_M = +T \left( \frac{\partial S}{\partial T} \right)_M.$$

== Definitions ==
The critical exponents $\alpha, \alpha', \beta, \gamma, \gamma'$ and $\delta$ are defined in terms of the behaviour of the order parameters and response functions near the critical point as follows

$$M(t,0) \simeq (-t)^{\beta}\mbox{ for }t \uparrow 0$$

$$M(0,H) \simeq |H|^{1/ \delta} \operatorname{sign}(H)\mbox{ for }H \rightarrow 0$$

$$\chi_T(t,0) \simeq \begin{cases}
(t)^{-\gamma}, & \textrm{for} \ t \downarrow 0 \\
(-t)^{-\gamma'}, & \textrm{for} \ t \uparrow 0 \end{cases}$$

$$c_H(t,0) \simeq \begin{cases}
(t)^{-\alpha} & \textrm{for} \ t \downarrow 0 \\
(-t)^{-\alpha'} & \textrm{for} \ t \uparrow 0 \end{cases}$$

where

$$t \ \stackrel{\mathrm{def}}{=}\   \frac{T-T_c}{T_c}$$

measures the temperature relative to the critical point.

== Derivation ==
Using the magnetic analogue of the Maxwell relations for the response functions, the relation

$$\chi_T (c_H -c_M) = T \left( \frac{\partial M}{\partial T} \right)_H^2$$

follows, and with thermodynamic stability requiring that $c_H, c_M\mbox{ and }\chi_T \geq 0$, one has

$$c_H \geq \frac{T}{\chi_T} \left( \frac{\partial M}{\partial T} \right)_H^2$$

which, under the conditions $H=0, t>0$ and the definition of the critical exponents gives

$$(-t)^{-\alpha'} \geq \mathrm{constant}\cdot(-t)^{\gamma'}(-t)^{2(\beta-1)}$$

which gives the Rushbrooke inequality

$$\alpha' + 2\beta + \gamma' \geq 2.$$

Remarkably, in experiment and in exactly solved models, the inequality actually holds as an equality.
