= Lambda point =

Superfluid transition temperature of helium-4

The plot of the specific heat capacity versus temperature.

The lambda point is the temperature at which normal fluid helium (helium I) makes the transition to superfluid state (helium II). At pressure of 1 atmosphere, the transition occurs at approximately 2.17 K. The lowest pressure at which He-I and He-II can coexist is the vapor−He-I−He-II triple point at 2.1768 K (−270.9732 °C) and 5.0418 kPa (0.049759 atm), which is the "saturated vapor pressure" at that temperature (pure helium gas in thermal equilibrium over the liquid surface, in a hermetic container). The highest pressure at which He-I and He-II can coexist is the bcc−He-I−He-II triple point with a helium solid at 1.762 K (−271.388 °C), 29.725 atm (3,011.9 kPa).

The point's name derives from the graph (pictured) that results from plotting the specific heat capacity as a function of temperature (for a given pressure in the above range, in the example shown, at 1 atmosphere), which resembles the Greek letter lambda $\lambda$. The specific heat capacity has a sharp peak as the temperature approaches the lambda point. The tip of the peak is so sharp that a critical exponent characterizing the divergence of the heat capacity can be measured precisely only in zero gravity, to provide a uniform density over a substantial volume of fluid. Hence, the heat capacity was measured within 2 nK below the transition in an experiment included in a Space Shuttle payload in 1992.

Unsolved problem in physics
Explain the discrepancy between the experimental and theoretical determinations of the heat capacity critical exponent α for the superfluid transition in helium-4.
More unsolved problems in physics

Although the heat capacity has a peak, it does not tend towards infinity (contrary to what the graph may suggest), but has finite limiting values when approaching the transition from above and below. The behavior of the heat capacity near the peak is described by the formula $C\approx A_\pm t^{-\alpha}+B_\pm$ where $t=|1-T/T_c|$ is the reduced temperature, $T_c$ is the Lambda point temperature, $A_\pm,B_\pm$ are constants (different above and below the transition temperature), and α is the critical exponent: $\alpha=-0.0127(3)$. Since this exponent is negative for the superfluid transition, specific heat remains finite.

The quoted experimental value of α is in a significant disagreement with the most precise theoretical determinations coming from high temperature expansion techniques, Monte Carlo methods and the conformal bootstrap.

== See also ==
- Lambda point refrigerator
