= Quantum rotor model =

Mathematical model for a quantum system

The quantum rotor model is a mathematical model for a quantum system. It can be visualized as an array of rotating electrons which behave as rigid rotors that interact through short-range dipole-dipole magnetic forces originating from their magnetic dipole moments (neglecting Coulomb forces). The model differs from similar spin-models such as the Ising model and the Heisenberg model in that it includes a term analogous to kinetic energy.

Although elementary quantum rotors do not exist in nature, the model can describe effective degrees of freedom for a system of sufficiently small number of closely coupled electrons in low-energy states.

== Formulation ==
Suppose the n-dimensional position (orientation) vector of the model at a given site $i$ is $\mathbf{n}$. Then, we can define rotor momentum $\mathbf{p}$ by the commutation relation of components $\alpha,\beta$

$[n_{\alpha},p_{\beta}]=i\delta_{\alpha\beta}$

However, it is found convenient to use rotor angular momentum operators $\mathbf{L}$ defined (in 3 dimensions) by components $L_{\alpha}=\varepsilon_{\alpha\beta\gamma}n_{\beta}p_{\gamma}$

Then, the magnetic interactions between the quantum rotors, and thus their energy states, can be described by the following Hamiltonian:

$$H_R=\frac{J\bar{g}}{2}\sum_i\mathbf{L}_i^2-J\sum_{\langle ij\rangle}\mathbf{n}_i\cdot\mathbf{n}_j$$

where $J,\bar{g}$ are constants.. The interaction sum is taken over nearest neighbors, as indicated by the angle brackets. For very small and very large $\bar{g}$, the Hamiltonian predicts two distinct configurations (ground states), namely "magnetically" ordered rotors and disordered or "paramagnetic" rotors, respectively.

The interactions between the quantum rotors can be described by another (equivalent) Hamiltonian, which treats the rotors not as magnetic moments but as local electric currents.

In higher dimensions, the Hamiltonian can be defined as

$$H_R=\frac{J\bar{g}}{2}\sum_i \Delta_i - J\sum_{\langle ij\rangle}\mathbf{n}_i\cdot\mathbf{n}_j$$

where $\Delta_i$ is the Laplace-Beltrami operator on the sphere $S^n$. It is exactly solvable in the large n limit.

== Properties ==
One of the important features of the rotor model is the continuous O(N) symmetry, and hence the corresponding continuous symmetry breaking in the magnetically ordered state. In a system with two layers of Heisenberg spins $\mathbf{S}_{1i}$ and $\mathbf{S}_{2i}$, the rotor model approximates the low-energy states of a Heisenberg antiferromagnet, with the Hamiltonian

$$H_d=K\sum_i\mathbf{S}_{1i}\cdot\mathbf{S}_{2i}+J\sum_{\langle ij\rangle}\left(\mathbf{S}_{1i}\cdot\mathbf{S}_{1j}+\mathbf{S}_{2i}\cdot\mathbf{S}_{2j}\right)$$

using the correspondence $\mathbf{L}_i=\mathbf{S}_{1i}+\mathbf{S}_{2i}$

== Applications ==
The particular case of the quantum rotor model which has O(2) symmetry can be used to describe a superconducting array of Josephson junctions or the behavior of bosons in optical lattices. Another specific case of O(3) symmetry is equivalent to a system of two layers (bilayer) of a quantum Heisenberg antiferromagnet; it can also describe double-layer quantum Hall ferromagnets. It can also be shown that the phase transition for the two dimensional rotor model has the same universality class as that of antiferromagnetic Heisenberg spin models.

== See also ==
- Quantum Heisenberg model
- N-vector model
- Classical Heisenberg model
- Classical XY model
- Ising model
