= Classical Heisenberg model =

Concept in statistical physics

In statistical physics, the classical Heisenberg model, developed by Werner Heisenberg, is the $n = 3$ case of the n-vector model, one of the models used to model ferromagnetism and other phenomena.

== Definition ==
The classical Heisenberg model can be formulated as follows: take a d-dimensional lattice, and place a set of spins of unit length,

$$\vec{s}_i \in \mathbb{R}^3, |\vec{s}_i|=1\quad (1)$$,

on each lattice node.

The model is defined through the following Hamiltonian:

$$\mathcal{H} = -\sum_{i,j} \mathcal{J}_{ij} \vec{s}_i \cdot \vec{s}_j\quad (2)$$

where

$$\mathcal{J}_{ij} = \begin{cases} J & \mbox{if }i, j\mbox{ are neighbors} \\ 0 & \mbox{else.}\end{cases}$$

is a coupling between spins.

The classical Heisenberg model is the semiclassical limit of the isotropic spin-s quantum Heisenberg model in the limit as s becomes large.

== Properties ==
- The general mathematical formalism used to describe and solve the Heisenberg model and certain generalizations is developed in the article on the Potts model.
- In the continuum limit the Heisenberg model (2) gives the following equation of motion

$$\vec{S}_{t}=\vec{S}\wedge \vec{S}_{xx}.$$

This equation is called the continuous classical Heisenberg ferromagnet equation or, more shortly, the Heisenberg model and is integrable in the sense of soliton theory. It admits several integrable and nonintegrable generalizations like the Landau-Lifshitz equation, the Ishimori equation, and so on.

=== One dimension ===
- In the case of a long-range interaction, $J_{x,y}\sim |x-y|^{-\alpha}$, the thermodynamic limit is well defined if $\alpha >1$; the magnetization remains zero if $\alpha \ge 2$; but the magnetization is positive, at a low enough temperature, if $1< \alpha < 2$ (infrared bounds).
- As in any 'nearest-neighbor' n-vector model with free boundary conditions, if the external field is zero, there exists a simple exact solution.

=== Two dimensions ===
- In the case of a long-range interaction, $J_{x,y}\sim |x-y|^{-\alpha}$, the thermodynamic limit is well defined if $\alpha >2$; the magnetization remains zero if $\alpha \ge 4$; but the magnetization is positive at a low enough temperature if $2< \alpha < 4$ (infrared bounds).
- Polyakov has conjectured that, as opposed to the classical XY model, there is no dipole phase for any $T>0$; namely, at non-zero temperatures the correlations cluster exponentially fast.

=== Three and higher dimensions ===
Independently of the range of the interaction, at a low enough temperature the magnetization is positive.

Conjecturally, in each of the low temperature extremal states the truncated correlations decay algebraically.

== See also ==
- Quantum Heisenberg model
- Quantum rotor model
- Ising model
- Classical XY model
- Magnetism
- Ferromagnetism
- Landau–Lifshitz equation
- Ishimori equation
