= Quantum Heisenberg model =

Statistical model in quantum mechanics of magnetic materials

The quantum Heisenberg model, developed by Werner Heisenberg, is a statistical mechanical model used in the study of critical points and phase transitions of magnetic systems, in which the spins of the magnetic systems are treated quantum mechanically. It is related to the prototypical Ising model, where at each site of a lattice, a spin $\sigma_i \in \{ \pm 1\}$ represents a microscopic magnetic dipole to which the magnetic moment is either up or down. Except the coupling between magnetic dipole moments, there is also a multipolar version of Heisenberg model called the multipolar exchange interaction.

== Overview ==
For quantum mechanical reasons (see exchange interaction or Magnetism § Quantum-mechanical origin of magnetism), the dominant coupling between two dipoles may cause nearest-neighbors to have lowest energy when they are aligned. Under this assumption (so that magnetic interactions only occur between adjacent dipoles) and on a 1-dimensional periodic lattice, the Hamiltonian can be written in the form

$$\hat H = -J \sum_{j =1}^{N} \sigma_j \sigma_{j+1} - h \sum_{j =1}^{N} \sigma_j$$,

where $J$ is the coupling constant and dipoles are represented by classical vectors (or "spins") σ_{j}, subject to the periodic boundary condition $\sigma_{N+1} = \sigma_1$. The Heisenberg model is a more realistic model in that it treats the spins quantum-mechanically, by replacing the spin by a quantum operator acting upon the tensor product $(\mathbb{C}^2)^{\otimes N}$, of dimension $2^N$. To define it, recall the Pauli spin-1/2 matrices

$$\sigma^x =
\begin{pmatrix}
0&1\\
1&0
\end{pmatrix}$$,

$$\sigma^y =
\begin{pmatrix}
0&-i\\
i&0
\end{pmatrix}$$,

$$\sigma^z =
\begin{pmatrix}
1&0\\
0&-1
\end{pmatrix}$$,

and for $1\le j\le N$ and $a\in \{x,y,z\}$ denote $\sigma_j^a = I^{\otimes j-1}\otimes \sigma^a \otimes I^{\otimes N-j}$, where $I$ is the $2\times 2$ identity matrix. Given a choice of real-valued coupling constants $J_x, J_y,$ and $J_z$, the Hamiltonian is given by

$$\hat H = -\frac{1}{2} \sum_{j=1}^{N} (J_x \sigma_j^x \sigma_{j+1}^x + J_y \sigma_j^y \sigma_{j+1}^y + J_z \sigma_j^z \sigma_{j+1}^z + h\sigma_j^{z})$$

where the $h$ on the right-hand side indicates the external magnetic field, with periodic boundary conditions. The objective is to determine the spectrum of the Hamiltonian, from which the partition function can be calculated and the thermodynamics of the system can be studied.

It is common to name the model depending on the values of $J_x$, $J_y$ and $J_z$: if $J_x \neq J_y \neq J_z$, the model is called the Heisenberg XYZ model; in the case of $J = J_x = J_y \neq J_z = \Delta$, it is the Heisenberg XXZ model; if $J_x = J_y = J_z = J$, it is the Heisenberg XXX model. The spin 1/2 Heisenberg model in one dimension may be solved exactly using the Bethe ansatz. In the algebraic formulation, these are related to particular quantum affine algebras and elliptic quantum groups in the XXZ and XYZ cases respectively. Other approaches do so without Bethe ansatz.

=== XXX model ===
The physics of the Heisenberg XXX model strongly depends on the sign of the coupling constant $J$ and the dimension of the space. For positive $J$ the ground state is always ferromagnetic. At negative $J$ the ground state is antiferromagnetic in two and three dimensions. In one dimension the nature of correlations in the antiferromagnetic Heisenberg model depends on the spin of the magnetic dipoles. If the spin is integer then only short-range order is present. A system of half-integer spins exhibits quasi-long range order.

A simplified version of Heisenberg model is the one-dimensional Ising model, where the transverse magnetic field is in the x-direction, and the interaction is only in the z-direction:

$$\hat H = -J \sum_{j =1}^{N} \sigma_j^z \sigma_{j+1}^z - gJ \sum_{j =1}^{N} \sigma_j^x$$.

At small g and large g, the ground state degeneracy is different, which implies that there must be a quantum phase transition in between. It can be solved exactly for the critical point using the duality analysis. The duality transition of the Pauli matrices is $\sigma_i^z = \prod_{j \leq i}S^x_j$ and $\sigma_i^x = S^z_i S^z_{i+1}$, where $S^x$ and $S^z$ are also Pauli matrices which obey the Pauli matrix algebra. Under periodic boundary conditions, the transformed Hamiltonian can be shown is of a very similar form:

$$\hat H = -gJ \sum_{j =1}^{N} S_j^z S_{j+1}^z - J \sum_{j =1}^{N} S_j^x$$

but for the $g$ attached to the spin interaction term. Assuming that there's only one critical point, we can conclude that the phase transition happens at $g=1$.

== Solution by Bethe ansatz ==
The Bethe ansatz is regarded as the pioneering method that founded the field of quantum integrable systems. The mathematical techniques developed by Hans Bethe in this context were later widely applied to solve many other low-dimensional quantum many-body models. For researchers in condensed matter physics, his paper marked a watershed moment—representing the transition from ″approximate theories″ (such as mean-field theory) to ″exact solutions.″

This breakthrough eventually led Nobel laureate Chen-Ning Yang and his brother Chen-Ping Yang to carry out important rigorous work on the one-dimensional Heisenberg model and its extension, the XXZ model. Their results were published in the Physical Review, the journal of the American Physical Society. This series of highly influential papers, published in 1966, is collectively known as the Yang brothers' classic work on quantum spin chains.

- First paper: Proof of the validity of the Bethe hypothesis. This work rigorously demonstrated that, for finite-length anisotropic Heisenberg chains (the XXZ model), the wavefunctions obtained from Bethe's ansatz are indeed eigenstates of the Hamiltonian. It provided an essential mathematical completion and formalization of Bethe's original work.
- Second paper: Ground-state energy properties. In the thermodynamic limit of an infinite chain, they calculated the ground-state energy and analyzed its analytic properties.
- Third paper: Applications and excited states. This study explored physical applications of the model, including magnetization curves and magnetic susceptibility.

=== XXX_{1/2} model ===
Following the approach of Ludwig Faddeev (1996), the spectrum of the Hamiltonian for the XXX model
$$H = \frac{1}{4}\sum_{\alpha, n}(\sigma^\alpha_{n}\sigma^\alpha_{n+1} - 1)$$
can be determined by the Bethe ansatz. In this context, for an appropriately defined family of operators $B(\lambda)$ dependent on a spectral parameter $\lambda \in \mathbb{C}$ acting on the total Hilbert space $\mathcal{H} = \bigotimes_{n=1}^N h_n$ with each $h_n \cong \mathbb{C}^2$, a Bethe vector is a vector of the form
$$\Phi(\lambda_1, \cdots, \lambda_m) = B(\lambda_1)\cdots B(\lambda_m)v_0$$
where $v_0 = \bigotimes_{n=1}^N |\uparrow\,\rangle$. If the $\lambda_k$ satisfy the Bethe equation
$$\left(\frac{\lambda_k + i/2}{\lambda_k - i/2}\right)^N = \prod_{j \neq k}\frac{\lambda_k - \lambda_j + i}{\lambda_k - \lambda_j - i},$$
then the Bethe vector is an eigenvector of $H$ with eigenvalue $-\sum_k \frac{1}{2}\frac{1}{\lambda_k^2 + 1/4}$.

The family $B(\lambda)$ as well as three other families come from a transfer matrix $T(\lambda)$ (in turn defined using a Lax matrix), which acts on $\mathcal{H}$ along with an auxiliary space $h_a \cong \mathbb{C}^2$, and can be written as a $2\times 2$ block matrix with entries in $\mathrm{End}(\mathcal{H})$,
$$T(\lambda) = \begin{pmatrix}A(\lambda) & B(\lambda) \\ C(\lambda) & D(\lambda)\end{pmatrix},$$
which satisfies fundamental commutation relations (FCRs) similar in form to the Yang–Baxter equation used to derive the Bethe equations. The FCRs also show there is a large commuting subalgebra given by the generating function $F(\lambda) = \mathrm{tr}_a(T(\lambda)) = A(\lambda) + D(\lambda)$, as $[F(\lambda), F(\mu)] = 0$, so when $F(\lambda)$ is written as a polynomial in $\lambda$, the coefficients all commute, spanning a commutative subalgebra which $H$ is an element of. The Bethe vectors are in fact simultaneous eigenvectors for the whole subalgebra.

=== XXX_{s} model ===
For higher spins, say spin $s$, replace $\sigma^\alpha$ with $S^\alpha$ coming from the Lie algebra representation of the Lie algebra $\mathfrak{sl}(2, \mathbb{C})$, of dimension $2s + 1$. The XXX_{s} Hamiltonian
$$H = \sum_{\alpha, n}(S^\alpha_{n}S^\alpha_{n+1} - (S^\alpha_{n}S^\alpha_{n+1})^2)$$
is solvable by Bethe ansatz with Bethe equations
$$\left(\frac{\lambda_k + is}{\lambda_k - is}\right)^N = \prod_{j \neq k}\frac{\lambda_k - \lambda_j + i}{\lambda_k - \lambda_j - i}.$$

=== XXZ_{s} model ===
For spin $s$ and a parameter $\gamma$ for the deformation from the XXX model, the BAE (Bethe ansatz equation) is
$$\left(\frac{\sinh(\lambda_k + is\gamma)}{\sinh(\lambda_k - is\gamma)}\right)^N = \prod_{j \neq k}\frac{\sinh(\lambda_k - \lambda_j + i\gamma)}{\sinh(\lambda_k - \lambda_j - i\gamma)}.$$
Notably, for $s = \frac{1}{2}$ these are precisely the BAEs for the six-vertex model, after identifying $\gamma = 2\eta$, where $\eta$ is the anisotropy parameter of the six-vertex model. This was originally thought to be coincidental until Baxter showed the XXZ Hamiltonian was contained in the algebra generated by the transfer matrix $T(\nu)$, given exactly by
$$H_{XXZ_{1/2}} = -i \sin 2\eta \frac{d}{d\nu}\log T(\nu)\Big|_{\nu = -i\eta} - \frac{1}{2}\cos 2\eta 1^{\otimes N}.$$

== Lieb-Schultz-Mattis theorem ==
The Lieb-Schultz-Mattis (LSM) theorem demonstrates that in a one-dimensional antiferromagnetic Heisenberg model with half-integer spins, under translational symmetry and spin rotational symmetry, there must exist an excited state. This excited state has the same magnetization as the ground state but differs in crystal momentum by $\pi$, and in the thermodynamic limit it becomes degenerate with the ground-state energy. In other words, the energy spectrum of a one-dimensional Heisenberg model with half-integer spins is gapless. The LSM theorem was later generalized by the Japanese physicist Masaki Oshikawa, extending its applicability from the original one-dimensional half-integer spin chains to systems of higher dimensions.

== Haldane conjecture ==
According to the LSM theorem, the ground state of the one-dimensional antiferromagnetic Heisenberg model with half-integer spins ($S=1/2, 3/2, 5/2$,...) has no spin gap. However, the one-dimensional antiferromagnetic Heisenberg model with integer spins ($S=1,2,3$,...) does not fall within the framework of the LSM theorem and may therefore exhibit fundamentally different properties. Duncan Haldane proposed that the ground state of the integer-spin antiferromagnetic Heisenberg chain possesses a spin gap, a prediction later known as the Haldane conjecture, with the gap itself referred to as the Haldane gap.

The Haldane conjecture has been extensively verified, both through numerical calculations and experimental measurements of the spin gap in materials with integer-spin chains. This further inspired physicists to investigate the origin of the gap and its relation to topological properties, marking a milestone in the understanding of topological phases and topological phase transitions in matter. For his ″theoretical discoveries of topological phase transitions and topological phases of matter,″ Duncan Haldane shared the 2016 Nobel Prize in Physics with J. Michael Kosterlitz and David Thouless.

== Applications ==
- Another important object is entanglement entropy. One way to describe it is to subdivide the unique ground state into a block (several sequential spins) and the environment (the rest of the ground state). The entropy of the block can be considered as entanglement entropy. At zero temperature in the critical region (thermodynamic limit) it scales logarithmically with the size of the block. As the temperature increases the logarithmic dependence changes into a linear function. For large temperatures linear dependence follows from the second law of thermodynamics.
- The Heisenberg model provides an important and tractable theoretical example for applying density matrix renormalisation.
- The six-vertex model can be solved using the algebraic Bethe ansatz for the Heisenberg spin chain (Baxter 1982).
- The half-filled Hubbard model in the limit of strong repulsive interactions can be mapped onto a Heisenberg model with $J<0$ representing the strength of the superexchange interaction.
- Limits of the model as the lattice spacing is sent to zero (and various limits are taken for variables appearing in the theory) describes integrable field theories, both non-relativistic such as the nonlinear Schrödinger equation, and relativistic, such as the $S^2$ sigma model, the $S^3$ sigma model (which is also a principal chiral model) and the sine-Gordon model.
- Calculating certain correlation functions in the planar or large $N$ limit of N = 4 supersymmetric Yang–Mills theory

== Extended symmetry ==
The integrability is underpinned by the existence of large symmetry algebras for the different models. For the XXX case this is the Yangian $Y(\mathfrak{sl}_2)$, while in the XXZ case this is the quantum group $\widehat{ \mathfrak{sl}}_q(2)$, the q-deformation of the affine Lie algebra of $\widehat{\mathfrak{sl}}_2$, as explained in the notes by Faddeev (1996).

These appear through the transfer matrix, and the condition that the Bethe vectors are generated from a state $\Omega$ satisfying $C(\lambda) \cdot \Omega = 0$ corresponds to the solutions being part of a highest-weight representation of the extended symmetry algebras.

== See also ==
- Classical Heisenberg model
- DMRG of the Heisenberg model
- Quantum rotor model
- t-J model
- J1 J2 model
- Majumdar–Ghosh model
- AKLT model
- Multipolar exchange interaction
