= Torsional oscillator =

Torsional pendulum

A torsional oscillator, or torsional pendulum, is a device that consists of a mass suspended from a rod, wire, or torsion fiber. When it experiences a rotation, the mass rotates which causes the string to twist instead of oscillating back and forth or stretching. The mass at the bottom undergoes harmonic oscillation about some equilibrium. While pendulums and block-spring systems experience simple or damped harmonic motion from restoring forces, the torsional oscillator has restoring torques.

== Mechanics ==
For the ideal model of a torsional oscillator, the equation of motion is unaffected by friction and air resistance. The nature of the oscillation depends on the moment of inertia (I) of the oscillating mass and the torsional constant (\Kappa) of the wire or string. Like other oscillating systems, the equation relates some form of displacement to a restoring force. A torsional pendulum undergoes angular motion, so it is given as:

$I \ddot{\theta}+\kappa \theta = 0$

The general solution for this equation of motion given the boundary condition of zero initial velocity is:

$\theta(t)=Acos(\omega t)$

Where the angular frequency and period of oscillation are:

$\omega=\sqrt{\frac{\kappa}{I}}$ and $T=2\pi \sqrt{\frac{I}{\kappa}}$

Torsional pendulum with $I=\frac{mL^2}{2}$

Underdamping, critical damping, and overdamping of harmonic oscillators

for small angles.

The moment of inertia of a torsional oscillator is simply the moment of inertia of its bob rotating about the z-axis. For a torsional pendulum with two point masses suspended by a massless rod and string, the moment of inertia would involve the point masses rotating about the center of mass at $\frac{L}{2}$.

$I_{CM}=m(\frac{L}{2})^2+m(\frac{L}{2})^2=\frac{mL^2}{2}$

=== Damped torsional oscillator ===
Damping is the loss of energy in an oscillating system by dissipation. This is usually from surface friction, viscous solutions, or currents in electronic oscillators. The different types of damping are measured with the damping ratio, denoted by zeta ($\zeta$). The damping ratio is the dimensionless ratio of the actual damping in the system to the critical damping.

A torsional pendulum can be damped in any of the following ways:

- Air resistance or sliding friction, which is normally present in unideal systems, creates underdamping ($0<\zeta<1$).
- Eddy currents create a critically damped oscillator ($\zeta=1$).
- Drag from fluids leads to overdamping in an oscillator ($\zeta>1$).

The equation of motion for a damped torsional oscillator is similar to that of the ideal case. In the damped case, it has a resistive force dependent on its angular velocity.

$I\ddot{\theta}+I\gamma \dot{\theta}+\kappa \theta=0$

Which is rearranged as:

$\ddot{\theta}+\gamma \dot{\theta}+{\omega_0}^2=0$

where $\omega_0=\sqrt{\frac{\kappa}{I}}$

In the case of light damping where the oscillator is underdamped, the real solution (no imaginary components) is:

$\theta(t)=\theta_0 e^{-\gamma t/2} \cos(\omega_dt+\phi)$

where $\omega_d=\sqrt{\omega_0^2-(\frac{\gamma}{2})^2}$ , $\theta_0$ is the maximum angular displacement, and $\phi$ is the phase angle.

== Applications ==
Torsional Pendulum Clock

=== Torsion pendulum clock ===
A common use of a torsional pendulum, along with other oscillators, is timekeeping since it swings with a specific and constant angular frequency under certain conditions. American inventor Aaron Crane invented the Torsion Pendulum Clock in 1841. There are also claims of the German inventor Anton Harder inventing the same device independently of Crane in 1879. The clock contains a long torsion spring with a few balls on spokes attached to the wire. The clock's springs and gears also exerted a torque on the oscillator to negate natural dampening effects.

=== Torsion spring ===
A torsion spring is a spring that stores elastic energy when twisted. When the coils unbend, the spring releases energy as a rotational torque and provides a constant rotational force. These springs have uses in common items such as watches and large garage doors. The different types are clip, hinge, counterbalance, and torque-control springs, which all serve different purposes. The springs grip objects, open or close doors, offset weight, and apply constant rotational motion respectively.

Types of torsion springs	Use
Clip	Holds things in place or grips strongly
Hinge	Opens or closes doors
Counterbalance	Offsets heavy weights
Torque-control	Applies consistent torque
