= ZN model =

The $Z_N$ model (also known as the clock model) is a simplified statistical mechanical spin model. It is a generalization of the Ising model. Although it can be defined on an arbitrary graph, it is integrable only on one and two-dimensional lattices, in several special cases.

== Definition ==
The $Z_N$ model is defined by assigning a spin value at each node $r$ on a graph, with the spins taking values $s_r=\exp{\frac{2\pi i q}{N}}$, where $q\in \{0,1,\ldots,N-1\}$. The spins therefore take values in the form of complex roots of unity. Roughly speaking, we can think of the spins assigned to each node of the $Z_N$ model as pointing in any one of $N$ equidistant directions. The Boltzmann weights for a general edge $rr'$ are:

$$w\left(r,r'\right)=\sum_{k=0}^{N-1}x_{k}^{\left(rr'\right)}\left(s_{r}s_{r'}^*\right)^k$$

where $*$ denotes complex conjugation and the $x_{k}^{\left(rr'\right)}$ are related to the interaction strength along the edge $rr'$. Note that $x_{k}^{\left(rr'\right)}=x_{N-k}^{\left(rr'\right)}$ and $x_0$ are often set to 1. The (real valued) Boltzmann weights are invariant under the transformations $s_r \rightarrow \omega^k s_r$ and $s_r \rightarrow s^{*}_{r}$, analogous to universal rotation and reflection respectively.

== Self-dual critical solution ==
There is a class of solutions to the $Z_N$ model defined on an in general anisotropic square lattice. If the model is self-dual in the Kramers–Wannier sense and thus critical, and the lattice is such that there are two possible 'weights' $x_k^1$ and $x_k^2$ for the two possible edge orientations, we can introduce the following parametrization in $\alpha$:

$$x_n^1=x_{n}\left(\alpha\right)$$
$x_n^2=x_{n}\left(\pi-\alpha\right)$–

Requiring the duality relation and the star–triangle relation, which ensures integrability, to hold, it is possible to find the solution:

$$x_{n}\left(\alpha\right)=\prod_{k=0}^{n-1}\frac{\sin\left(\pi k/N+\alpha/2N\right)}{\sin\left[\pi\left(k+1\right)/N-\alpha/2N\right]}$$

with $x_0=1$. This particular case of the $Z_N$ model is often called the FZ model in its own right, after V.A. Fateev and A.B. Zamolodchikov who first calculated this solution. The FZ model approaches the XY model in the limit as $N\rightarrow\infty$. It is also a special case of the chiral Potts model and the Kashiwara–Miwa model.

== Solvable special cases ==
As is the case for most lattice models in statistical mechanics, there are no known exact solutions to the $Z_N$ model in three dimensions. In two dimensions, however, it is exactly solvable on a square lattice for certain values of $N$ and/or the 'weights' $x_{k}$. Perhaps the most well-known example is the Ising model, which admits spins in two opposite directions (i.e. $s_r=\pm 1$). This is precisely the $Z_N$ model for $N=2$, and therefore the $Z_N$ model can be thought of as a generalization of the Ising model. Other exactly solvable models corresponding to particular cases of the $Z_N$ model include the three-state Potts model, with $N=3$ and $x_1=x_2=x_c$, where $x_c$ is a certain critical value (FZ), and the critical Askin–Teller model where $N=4$.

== Quantum version ==
A quantum version of the $Z_N$ clock model can be constructed in a manner analogous to the transverse-field Ising model. The Hamiltonian of this model is the following:

$$H = -J\left[\sum_{ \langle i, j \rangle} (Z^\dagger_i Z_{j}+ Z_i Z^{\dagger}_{j}) + g \sum_j (X_j + X^\dagger_j) \right]$$

Here, the subscripts refer to lattice sites, and the sum $\sum_{\langle i, j \rangle}$ is done over pairs of nearest neighbour sites $i$ and $j$. The clock matrices $X_j$ and $Z_j$ are generalisations of the Pauli matrices satisfying

$$Z_j X_k = e^{\frac{2\pi i  }{N}\delta_{j,k}} X_k Z_j$$

and

$$X_j^N = Z_j^N = 1$$

where $\delta_{j,k}$ is 1 if $j$ and $k$ are the same site and zero otherwise. $J$ is a prefactor with dimensions of energy, and $g$ is another coupling coefficient that determines the relative strength of the external field compared to the nearest neighbour interaction.
