= Zimm–Bragg model =

In statistical mechanics, the Zimm–Bragg model is a helix-coil transition model that describes helix-coil transitions of macromolecules, usually polymer chains. Most models provide a reasonable approximation of the fractional helicity of a given polypeptide; the Zimm–Bragg model differs by incorporating the ease of propagation (self-replication) with respect to nucleation. It is named for co-discoverers Bruno H. Zimm and J. K. Bragg.

== Helix-coil transition models ==
Helix-coil transition models assume that polypeptides are linear chains composed of interconnected segments. Further, models group these sections into two broad categories: coils, random conglomerations of disparate unbound pieces, are represented by the letter 'C', and helices, ordered states where the chain has assumed a structure stabilized by hydrogen bonding, are represented by the letter 'H'.

Thus, it is possible to loosely represent a macromolecule as a string such as CCCCHCCHCHHHHHCHCCC and so forth. The number of coils and helices factors into the calculation of fractional helicity, $\theta \$, defined as

$$\theta = \frac{\left \langle i \right \rangle}{N}$$

where

$\left \langle i \right \rangle \$ is the average helicity and
$N \$ is the number of helix or coil units.

== Zimm–Bragg ==
Dimer sequence	Statistical weight
$...CC... \$	$1 \$
$...CH... \$	$\sigma s \$
$...HC... \$	$\sigma s \$
$...HH... \$	$\sigma s^2 \$

The Zimm–Bragg model takes the cooperativity of each segment into consideration when calculating fractional helicity. The probability of any given monomer being a helix or coil is affected by which the previous monomer is; that is, whether the new site is a nucleation or propagation.

By convention, a coil unit ('C') is always of statistical weight 1. Addition of a helix state ('H') to a previously coiled state (nucleation) is assigned a statistical weight $\sigma s \$, where $\sigma \$ is the nucleation parameter and $s \$ is the equilibrium constant

$$s = \frac{[H]}{[C]}$$

Adding a helix state to a site that is already a helix (propagation) has a statistical weight of $s \$. For most proteins,

$$\sigma \ll 1 < s \$$

which makes the propagation of a helix more favorable than nucleation of a helix from coil state.

From these parameters, it is possible to compute the fractional helicity $\theta \$. The average helicity $\left \langle i \right \rangle \$ is given by

$$\left \langle i \right \rangle  = \left(\frac{s}{q}\right)\frac{dq}{ds}$$

where $q \$ is the partition function given by the sum of the probabilities of each site on the polypeptide. The fractional helicity is thus given by the equation

$$\theta = \frac{1}{N}\left(\frac{s}{q}\right)\frac{dq}{ds}$$

== Statistical mechanics ==
The Zimm–Bragg model is equivalent to a one-dimensional Ising model and has no long-range interactions, i.e., interactions between residues well separated along the backbone; therefore, by the famous argument of Rudolf Peierls, it cannot undergo a phase transition.

The statistical mechanics of the Zimm–Bragg model may be solved exactly using the transfer-matrix method. The two parameters of the Zimm–Bragg model are σ, the statistical weight for nucleating a helix and s, the statistical weight for propagating a helix. These parameters may depend on the residue j; for example, a proline residue may easily nucleate a helix but not propagate one; a leucine residue may nucleate and propagate a helix easily; whereas glycine may disfavor both the nucleation and propagation of a helix. Since only nearest-neighbour interactions are considered in the Zimm–Bragg model, the full partition function for a chain of N residues can be written as follows

$$\mathcal{Z} = \left( 0, 1\right) \cdot \left\{ \prod_{j=1}^{N} \mathbf{W}_{j} \right\} \cdot \left( 1 , 1\right)$$

where the 2x2 transfer matrix W_{j} of the jth residue equals the matrix of statistical weights for the state transitions

$$\mathbf{W}_{j} = \begin{bmatrix}
s_{j} & 1 \\
\sigma_{j} s_{j} & 1
\end{bmatrix}$$

The row-column entry in the transfer matrix equals the statistical weight for making a transition from state row in residue j − 1 to state column in residue j. The two states here are helix (the first) and coil (the second). Thus, the upper left entry s is the statistical weight for transitioning from helix to helix, whereas the lower left entry σs is that for transitioning from coil to helix.

== See also ==
- Alpha helix
- Lifson–Roig model
- Random coil
- Statistical mechanics
