= Replica cluster move =

Replica cluster move in condensed matter physics refers to a family of non-local cluster algorithms used to simulate spin glasses. It is an extension of the Swendsen-Wang algorithm in that it generates non-trivial spin clusters informed by the interaction states on two (or more) replicas instead of just one. It is different from the replica exchange method (or parallel tempering), as it performs a non-local update on a fraction of the sites between the two replicas at the same temperature, while parallel tempering directly exchanges all the spins between two replicas at different temperature. However, the two are often used alongside to achieve state-of-the-art efficiency in simulating spin-glass models.

== The Chayes-Machta-Redner representation ==
The Chayes-Machta-Redner (CMR) representation is a graphical representation of the Ising spin glass which extends the standard FK representation. It is based on the observation that the total Hamiltonian of two independent Ising replicas α and β,

$H = -\sum_{<ij>}J_{ij} \big( \sigma_i^{\alpha}\sigma_j^{\alpha} + \sigma_i^{\beta}\sigma_j^{\beta} \big),$

can be written as the Hamiltonian of a 4-state clock model. To see this, we define the following mapping

$(\sigma^{\alpha},\sigma^{\beta}) \to \theta: \quad \big\{ (+1,+1), (+1,-1), (-1,-1), (-1,+1) \big\} \mapsto \big\{ 0, \frac{\pi}{2}, \pi, \frac{3\pi}{2} \big\},$

where $\theta$ is the orientation of the 4-state clock, then the total Hamiltonian can be represented as

$H = - 2 J_{ij}\sum_{<ij>} \cos(\theta_j - \theta_i).$

In the graphical representation of this model, there are two types of bonds that can be open, referred to as blue and red. To generate the bonds on the lattice, the following rules are imposed:

- If $J_{ij}\cos(\theta_j - \theta_i) = 1$, or when the interactions on edge $(i,j)$ are satisfied on both replicas, then a blue bond is open with probability $p_{\text{blue}} = 1-e^{-4\beta|J_{ij}|}$.
- If $J_{ij}\cos(\theta_j - \theta_i) = 0$, or when the interaction on edge $(i,j)$ is satisfied in exactly one replica, then a red bond is open with probability $p_{\text{red}} = 1-e^{-2\beta|J_{ij}|}$.
- Otherwise, a closed bond is formed.

Under these rules, it can be checked that a cycle of open bonds can only contain an even number of red bonds. A cluster formed with blue bonds is referred to as a blue cluster, and a super-cluster formed together with both blue and red bonds is referred to as a grey cluster.

Once the clusters are generated, there are two types of non-local updates that can be made to the clock states independently in the clock clusters (and thus the spin states in both replicas). First, for every blue cluster, we can flip (or rotate $180^{\circ}$) the clock states with some arbitrary probability. Following this, for every grey cluster (blue clusters connected with red bonds), we can rotate all the clock states simultaneously by a random angle.

It can be shown that both updates are consistent with the bond-formation rules, and satisfy detailed balance. Therefore, an algorithm based on this CMR representation will be correct when used in conjunction with other ergodic algorithms. However, the algorithm is not necessarily efficient, as a giant grey cluster will tend to span the entire lattice at sufficiently low temperatures (e.g. even at paramagnetic phases of spin-glass models).

== Houdayer cluster move ==
The Houdayer cluster move is a simpler cluster algorithm based on a site percolation process on sites with negative spin overlaps. It is discovered by Jerome Houdayer in 2001. For two independent Ising replicas, we can define the spin overlap as

$q_i = \sigma_i^{\alpha} \sigma_j^{\beta},$

and a cluster is formed by randomly selecting a site and percolating through the adjacent sites with $q = -1$ (with a percolation ratio of 1) until the maximal cluster is formed. The spins in the cluster are then exchanged between the two replicas. It can be shown that the exchange update is isoenergetic, meaning that the total energy is conserved in the update. This gives an acceptance ratio of 1 as calculated from the Metropolis-Hastings rule. In other words, the update is rejection-free.

=== Suppressing percolation of large clusters ===
The efficiency of this algorithm is highly sensitive to the site percolation threshold of the underlying lattice. If the percolation threshold is too small, then a giant cluster will likely span the entire lattice, resulting in the trivial update of exchanging nearly all the spins between the replicas. This is why the original algorithm only performs well in low dimensional settings (where the site percolation ratio is sufficiently high). To efficiently extend this algorithm to higher dimensions, one has to perform certain algorithmic interventions.

For instance, one can restrict the cluster moves to low-temperature replicas where one expects only a few number of negative-overlap sites to appear (such that the algorithm does not percolate supercritically). In addition, one can perform a global spin-flip in one of the two replicas when the number of negative-overlap sites exceeds half the lattice size, in order to further suppress the percolation process.

The Jorg cluster move is another way to reduce the sizes of the Houdayer clusters. In each Houdayer cluster, the algorithm forms open bonds with probability $1 - e^{-4\beta|J_{ij}|}$, similar to the Swensden-Wang algorithm. This will form sub-clusters that are smaller than the Houdayer clusters, and the spins in these sub-clusters can then be exchange between replicas in a similar fashion as a Houdayer cluster move.
