= Pieter Kasteleyn =

Dutch physicist (1924–1996)

Pieter Willem Kasteleyn
- Born: 12 October 1924; Leiden
- Died: 16 January 1996 (aged 71); Leiden
- Education: Leiden University
- Known for: FKT algorithm, Random cluster model, FKG inequality, Kasteleyn transition
- Scientific career
- Workplaces: Leiden University
- Doctoral advisor: L.J. Oosterhoff, S.R. de Groot

Pieter Willem "Piet" Kasteleyn (12 October 1924 – 16 January 1996) was a Dutch physicist famous for his contributions to the field of statistical mechanics.

== Biography ==
Pieter Willem Kasteleyn was born in Leiden on 12 October 1924. After finishing high school in 1942, Kasteleyn briefly studied chemistry in Amsterdam. After the war, Leiden University reopened, where he undertook the study of physics and graduated in 1951. He defended his Ph.D. thesis working under S.R. de Groot in 1956.

In 1963 Kasteleyn was nominated Full Professor at the Lorentz Institute of Theoretical Physics in Leiden. In 1979 he was elected a member of the Royal Netherlands Academy of Arts and Sciences. From 1981 to 1985 he acted as secretary of the Physics Section of the academy. From 1978 to 1984 he was chairman of the Commission for Theoretical Physics of the Dutch National Physics Foundation. He retired in 1985.

He died on 16 January 1996, after an unexpected and short illness.

== Research ==
While investigating dimers on a square lattice (essentially a domino tiling), he independently discovered combinatorial Fisher-Kasteleyn-Temperley algorithm. In a series of papers with C. M. Fortuin he developed random cluster model and obtained the FKG inequality. For Bernoulli percolation on graphs he formulated the Bunkbed conjecture.
