= Bunkbed conjecture =

Conjecture in probabilistic combinatorics

An example of a bunkbed graph

The bunkbed conjecture (also spelled bunk bed conjecture) is a statement in percolation theory, a branch of mathematics that studies the behavior of connected clusters in a random graph. The conjecture is named after its analogy to a bunk bed structure. It was first posited by Pieter Kasteleyn in 1985. In 2024, Nikita Gladkov, Igor Pak, and Alexander Zimin gave a counter-example to the bunkbed conjecture, proving that it is false.

== Description ==
The conjecture has many equivalent formulations. In the most general formulation it involves two identical graphs, referred to as the upper bunk and the lower bunk. These graphs are isomorphic, meaning they share the same structure. Additional edges, termed posts, are added to connect each vertex in the upper bunk with the corresponding vertex in the lower bunk.

Each edge in the graph is assigned a probability. The edges in the upper bunk and their corresponding edges in the lower bunk share the same probability. The probabilities assigned to the posts can be arbitrary.

A random subgraph of the bunkbed graph is then formed by independently deleting each edge based on the assigned probability.

Equivalently, it can be assumed that all edges have the same deletion probability $0<p<1$.

The bunkbed conjecture states that in the resulting random subgraph, the probability that a vertex x in the upper bunk is connected to some vertex y in the upper bunk is greater than or equal to the probability that x is connected to y′, the isomorphic copy of y in the lower bunk.

== Interpretation and significance ==
The conjecture suggests that two vertices of a graph are more likely to remain connected after randomly removing some edges if the graph distance between the vertices is smaller. This is intuitive, and similar questions for random walks and Ising model were resolved positively. The original motivation for the conjecture was its implication that, in a percolation on the infinite square grid, the probability of (0, 0) being connected to (x, y) for x, y ≥ 0 is greater than the probability of (0, 0) being connected to (x + 1, y).

It was proved for specific types of graphs, such as wheels, complete graphs, complete bipartite graphs, and graphs with a local symmetry. It was also proved in the limit p → 1 for any graph.

A counterexample for hypergraphs where each bunk has 10 vertices and 6 hyperedges of order 3. If all hyperedges and the indicated posts are selected with probability 1/2, vertices 1 and 10' are slightly more likely to be connected than 1 and 10. The original disproof to the standard bunkbed conjecture is based on this counterexample.

Counterexamples for generalizations of the bunkbed conjecture have been published for site percolation, hypergraphs, and directed graphs. The original disproof is based on a small counterexample in the 3-uniform hypergraph case with 10 vertices; the counterexample for the standard bunkbed conjecture with all edge probabilities equal to 1/2 (equivalent to the general case) has a planar bunk with 7222 vertices and 14442 edges, and where there is an x and y where connecting x to y′ is more probable by around $10^{-6509}$. They also show that there is a counterexample in the general case with 28 vertices and 54 edges on the bunk and an x and y where difference in probabilities of around $10^{-78}$ in favor of x to y′.
