= Lifson–Roig model =

In polymer science, the Lifson–Roig model is a helix-coil transition model applied to the alpha helix-random coil transition of polypeptides; it is a refinement of the Zimm–Bragg model that recognizes that a polypeptide alpha helix is only stabilized by a hydrogen bond only once three consecutive residues have adopted the helical conformation. To consider three consecutive residues each with two states (helix and coil), the Lifson–Roig model uses a 4x4 transfer matrix instead of the 2x2 transfer matrix of the Zimm–Bragg model, which considers only two consecutive residues. However, the simple nature of the coil state allows this to be reduced to a 3x3 matrix for most applications.

The Zimm–Bragg and Lifson–Roig models are but the first two in a series of analogous transfer-matrix methods in polymer science that have also been applied to nucleic acids and branched polymers. The transfer-matrix approach is especially elegant for homopolymers, since the statistical mechanics may be solved exactly using a simple eigenanalysis.

== Parameterization ==
The Lifson–Roig model is characterized by three parameters: the statistical weight for nucleating a helix, the weight for propagating a helix and the weight for forming a hydrogen bond, which is granted only if three consecutive residues are in a helical state. Weights are assigned at each position in a polymer as a function of the conformation of the residue in that position and as a function of its two neighbors. A statistical weight of 1 is assigned to the "reference state" of a coil unit whose neighbors are both coils, and a "nucleation" unit is defined (somewhat arbitrarily) as two consecutive helical units neighbored by a coil. A major modification of the original Lifson–Roig model introduces "capping" parameters for the helical termini, in which the N- and C-terminal capping weights may vary independently. The correlation matrix for this modification can be represented as a matrix M, reflecting the statistical weights of the helix state h and coil state c.

| M | hh | hc | ch | cc |
|---|---|---|---|---|
| hh | w | v | 0 | 0 |
| hc | 0 | 0 | $\sqrt{nc}$ | c |
| ch | v | v | 0 | 0 |
| cc | 0 | 0 | n | 1 |

The Lifson–Roig model may be solved by the transfer-matrix method using the transfer matrix M shown at the right, where w is the statistical weight for helix propagation, v for initiation, n for N-terminal capping, and c for C-terminal capping. (In the traditional model n and c are equal to 1.) The partition function for the helix-coil transition equilibrium is

$$Z = V \left(\prod_{i=0}^{N+1} M(i)\right)\tilde{V}$$

where V is the end vector $V=[0 0 0 1]$, arranged to ensure the coil state of the first and last residues in the polymer.

This strategy for parameterizing helix-coil transitions was originally developed for alpha helices, whose hydrogen bonds occur between residues i and i+4; however, it is straightforward to extend the model to 3_{10} helices and pi helices, with i+3 and i+5 hydrogen bonding patterns respectively. The complete alpha/3_{10}/pi transfer matrix includes weights for transitions between helix types as well as between helix and coil states. However, because 3_{10} helices are much more common in the tertiary structures of proteins than pi helices, extension of the Lifson–Roig model to accommodate 3_{10} helices - resulting in a 9x9 transfer matrix when capping is included - has found a greater range of application. Analogous extensions of the Zimm–Bragg model have been put forth but have not accommodated mixed helical conformations.
