= KBD =

KBD may refer to:

- K-B-D, a Semitic triliteral root meaning "be heavy"
- KBD algorithm, for simulating spin models
- Kabardian language (ISO 639 code), North Caucasus
- Kaiser–Bessel-derived window, in digital signal processing
- Kashin–Beck disease, a bone disease
- Kentucky Bourbon Distillers
- King's Bench Division
- <kbd></kbd>, the HTML element for keyboard input
