= Transfer-matrix method =

Transfer-matrix method may refer to:

- Transfer-matrix method (statistical mechanics), a mathematical technique used to write the partition function into a simpler form.
- Transfer-matrix method (optics), a method to analyze the propagation of electromagnetic or acoustic waves through a stratified medium.
- Ray transfer matrix analysis in geometric optics, a mathematical method for performing ray tracing calculations.
- Transfer-matrix method (combinatorics), a method for computing the total weight of all walks of a given length between a pair of vertices in a weighted graph.
