= Square lattice Ising model =

Model in statistical mechanics

In statistical mechanics, the two-dimensional square lattice Ising model is a simple lattice model of interacting magnetic spins, an example of the class of Ising models. The model is notable for having nontrivial interactions, yet having an analytical solution. The model was solved by Lars Onsager for the special case that the external magnetic field H = 0. An analytical solution for the general case for $H \neq 0$ has yet to be found.

== Defining the partition function ==
Consider a 2D Ising model on a square lattice $\Lambda$ with N sites and periodic boundary conditions in both the horizontal and vertical directions, which effectively reduces the topology of the model to a torus. Generally, the horizontal coupling $J$ and the vertical coupling $J^*$ are not equal. With $\textstyle \beta = \frac{1}{kT}$ and absolute temperature $T$ and the Boltzmann constant $k$, the partition function

$$Z_N(K \equiv \beta J, L \equiv \beta J^*) = \sum_{\{\sigma\}} \exp \left( K \sum_{\langle ij \rangle_H} \sigma_i \sigma_j + L \sum_{\langle ij \rangle_V} \sigma_i \sigma_j \right).$$

== Critical temperature ==
The critical temperature $T_\text{c}$ can be obtained from the Kramers–Wannier duality relation. Denoting the free energy per site as $F(K,L)$, one has:

$$\beta F\left(K^{*}, L^{*}\right) = \beta F\left(K,L\right) + \frac{1}{2}\log\big[\sinh\left(2K\right)\sinh\left(2L\right)\big]$$

where

$$\sinh\left(2K^{*}\right)\sinh\left(2L\right)=1$$
$$\sinh\left(2L^{*}\right)\sinh\left(2K\right)=1$$

Assuming that there is only one critical line in the (K, L) plane, the duality relation implies that this is given by:

$$\sinh\left(2 K\right)\sinh\left(2 L\right)= 1$$

For the isotropic case $J = J^{*}$, one finds the famous relation for the critical temperature $T_{c}$

$$\frac{k T_\text{c}}{J} = \frac{2}{\ln(1+\sqrt{2})} \approx 2.26918531421$$

== Dual lattice ==
Consider a configuration of spins $\{ \sigma \}$ on the square lattice $\Lambda$. Let r and s denote the number of unlike neighbours in the vertical and horizontal directions respectively. Then the summand in $Z_N$ corresponding to $\{ \sigma \}$ is given by

$$e^{K(N-2s) +L(N-2r)}$$

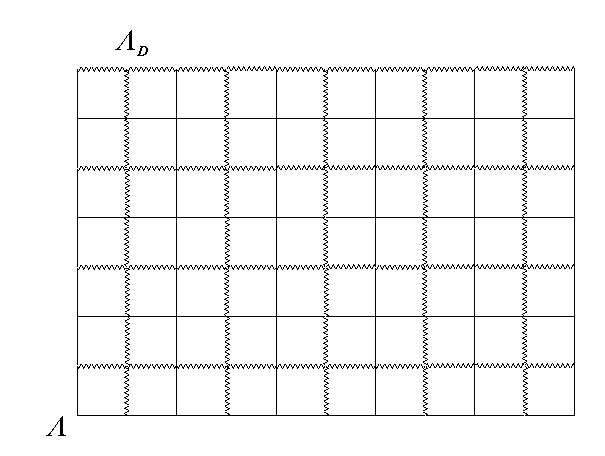
Dual lattice

Construct a dual lattice $\Lambda_D$ as depicted in the diagram. For every configuration $\{ \sigma \}$, a polygon is associated to the lattice by drawing a line on the edge of the dual lattice if the spins separated by the edge are unlike. Since by traversing a vertex of $\Lambda$ the spins need to change an even number of times so that one arrives at the starting point with the same charge, every vertex of the dual lattice is connected to an even number of lines in the configuration, defining a polygon.

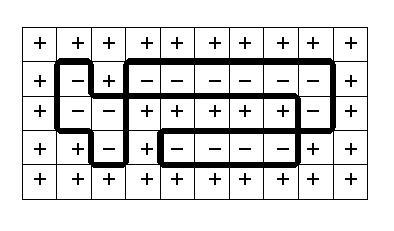
Spin configuration on a dual lattice

This reduces the partition function to

$$Z_N(K,L) = 2e^{N(K+L)} \sum_{P \subset \Lambda_D} e^{-2Lr-2Ks}$$

summing over all polygons in the dual lattice, where r and s are the number of horizontal and vertical lines in the polygon, with the factor of 2 arising from the inversion of spin configuration.

== Low-temperature expansion ==
At low temperatures, K, L approach infinity, so that as $T \rightarrow 0, \ \ e^{-K}, e^{-L} \rightarrow 0$, so that

$$Z_N(K,L) = 2 e^{N(K+L)} \sum_{ P \subset \Lambda_D} e^{-2Lr-2Ks}$$

defines a low temperature expansion of $Z_N(K,L)$.

== High-temperature expansion ==
Since $\sigma \sigma' = \pm 1$ one has

$$e^{K \sigma \sigma'} = \cosh K +  \sinh K(\sigma \sigma') = \cosh K(1+\tanh K(\sigma \sigma')).$$

Therefore

$$Z_N(K,L) = (\cosh K \cosh L)^N \sum_{\{ \sigma \}} \prod_{\langle ij \rangle_H} (1+v \sigma_i \sigma_j) \prod_{\langle ij \rangle_V}(1+w\sigma_i \sigma_j)$$

where $v =\tanh K$ and $w = \tanh L$. Since there are N horizontal and vertical edges, there are a total of $2^{2N}$ terms in the expansion. Every term corresponds to a configuration of lines of the lattice, by associating a line connecting i and j if the term $v \sigma_i \sigma_j$ (or $w \sigma_i \sigma_j)$ is chosen in the product. Summing over the configurations, using

$$\sum_{\sigma_i = \pm 1} \sigma_i^n = \begin{cases}
0 & \mbox{for } n \mbox{ odd} \\
2 & \mbox{for } n \mbox{ even} \end{cases}$$

shows that only configurations with an even number of lines at each vertex (polygons) will contribute to the partition function, giving

$$Z_N(K,L) = 2^N(\cosh K \cosh L)^N \sum_{P \subset \Lambda} v^r w^s$$

where the sum is over all polygons in the lattice. Since tanh K, tanh L $\rightarrow 0$ as $T \rightarrow \infty$, this gives the high temperature expansion of $Z_N(K,L)$.

The two expansions can be related using the Kramers–Wannier duality.

== Exact solution ==
The free energy per site in the limit $N\to\infty$ is given as follows. Define the parameter $k$ as

$$k =\frac{1}{\sinh\left(2 K\right)\sinh\left(2 L\right)}$$

The Helmholtz free energy per site $F$ can be expressed as

$$-\beta F = \frac{\log(2)}{2} + \frac{1}{2\pi}\int_{0}^{\pi}\log\left[\cosh\left(2 K\right)\cosh\left(2 L\right)+\frac{1}{k}\sqrt{1+k^{2}-2k\cos(2\theta)}\right]d\theta$$

For the isotropic case $J = J^{*}$, from the above expression one finds for the internal energy per site:

$$U = - J \coth(2 \beta J) \left[ 1 + \frac{2}{\pi} (2 \tanh^2(2 \beta J) -1) \int_0^{\pi/2} \frac{1}{\sqrt{1 - 4 k (1+k)^{-2} \sin^2(\theta)}} d\theta \right]$$

and the spontaneous magnetization is, for $T < T_\text{c}$,

$$M = \left[ 1 - \sinh^{-4}(2 \beta J) \right]^{1/8}$$

and $M = 0$ for $T \geq T_\text{c}$.

=== Transfer matrix ===
Start with an analogy with quantum mechanics. The Ising model on a long periodic lattice has a partition function

$$\sum_{\{S\}} \exp\biggl(\sum_{ij} S_{i,j} \left( S_{i,j+1} + S_{i+1,j} \right)\biggr).$$

Think of the i direction as space, and the j direction as time. This is an independent sum over all the values that the spins can take at each time slice. This is a type of path integral, it is the sum over all spin histories.

A path integral can be rewritten as a Hamiltonian evolution. The Hamiltonian steps through time by performing a unitary rotation between time t and time t + Δt:
$$U = e^{i H \Delta t}$$

The product of the U matrices, one after the other, is the total time evolution operator, which is the path integral we started with.

$$U^N = (e^{i H \Delta t})^N = \int DX e^{iL}$$

where N is the number of time slices. The sum over all paths is given by a product of matrices, each matrix element is the transition probability from one slice to the next.

Similarly, one can divide the sum over all partition function configurations into slices, where each slice is the one-dimensional configuration at time 1. This defines the transfer matrix:
$$T_{C_1 C_2}.$$

The configuration in each slice is a one-dimensional collection of spins. At each time slice, T has matrix elements between two configurations of spins, one in the immediate future and one in the immediate past. These two configurations are C_{1} and C_{2}, and they are all one-dimensional spin configurations. We can think of the vector space that T acts on as all complex linear combinations of these. Using quantum mechanical notation:
$$|A\rangle = \sum_S A(S) |S\rangle$$

where each basis vector $|S\rangle$ is a spin configuration of a one-dimensional Ising model.

Like the Hamiltonian, the transfer matrix acts on all linear combinations of states. The partition function is a matrix function of T, which is defined by the sum over all histories which come back to the original configuration after N steps:
$$Z= \mathrm{tr}(T^N).$$

Since this is a matrix equation, it can be evaluated in any basis. So if we can diagonalize the matrix T, we can find Z.

=== T in terms of Pauli matrices ===
The contribution to the partition function for each past/future pair of configurations on a slice is the sum of two terms. There is the number of spin flips in the past slice and there is the number of spin flips between the past and future slice. Define an operator on configurations which flips the spin at site i:

$$\sigma^x_i.$$

In the usual Ising basis, acting on any linear combination of past configurations, it produces the same linear combination but with the spin at position i of each basis vector flipped.

Define a second operator which multiplies the basis vector by +1 and −1 according to the spin at position i:

$$\sigma^z_i.$$

T can be written in terms of these:

$$\sum_i A \sigma^x_i + B \sigma^z_i \sigma^z_{i+1}$$

where A and B are constants which are to be determined so as to reproduce the partition function. The interpretation is that the statistical configuration at this slice contributes according to both the number of spin flips in the slice, and whether or not the spin at position i has flipped.

=== Spin flip creation and annihilation operators ===
Just as in the one-dimensional case, we will shift attention from the spins to the spin-flips. The σ^{z} term in T counts the number of spin flips, which we can write in terms of spin-flip creation and annihilation operators:

$$\sum C \psi^\dagger_i \psi_i. \,$$

The first term flips a spin, so depending on the basis state it either:

1. moves a spin-flip one unit to the right
2. moves a spin-flip one unit to the left
3. produces two spin-flips on neighboring sites
4. destroys two spin-flips on neighboring sites.

Writing this out in terms of creation and annihilation operators:
$$\sigma^x_i = D {\psi^\dagger}_i \psi_{i+1} + D^* {\psi^\dagger}_i \psi_{i-1} + C\psi_i \psi_{i+1} + C^* {\psi^\dagger}_i {\psi^\dagger}_{i+1}.$$

Ignore the constant coefficients, and focus attention on the form. They are all quadratic. Since the coefficients are constant, this means that the T matrix can be diagonalized by Fourier transforms.

Carrying out the diagonalization produces the Onsager free energy.
