= Transverse-field Ising model =

Mathematical model of magnetism

The transverse field Ising model is a quantum version of the classical Ising model. It features a lattice with nearest neighbour interactions determined by the alignment or anti-alignment of spin projections along the $z$ axis, as well as an external magnetic field perpendicular to the $z$ axis (without loss of generality, along the $x$ axis) which creates an energetic bias for one x-axis spin direction over the other.

An important feature of this setup is that, in a quantum sense, the spin projection along the $x$ axis and the spin projection along the $z$ axis are not commuting observable quantities. That is, they cannot both be observed simultaneously. This means classical statistical mechanics cannot describe this model, and a quantum treatment is needed.

Specifically, the model has the following quantum Hamiltonian:

$$H = -J\left(\sum_{ \langle i, j \rangle} Z_i Z_{j} + g \sum_j X_j \right)$$

Here, the subscripts refer to lattice sites, and the sum $\sum_{\langle i, j \rangle}$ is done over pairs of nearest neighbour sites $i$ and $j$. $X_j$ and $Z_j$ are representations of elements of the spin algebra (Pauli matrices, in the case of spin 1/2) acting on the spin variables of the corresponding sites. They anti-commute with each other if on the same site and commute with each other if on different sites. $J$ is a prefactor with dimensions of energy, and $g$ is another coupling coefficient that determines the relative strength of the external field compared to the nearest neighbour interaction.

== Phases of the 1D transverse field Ising model ==
Below the discussion is restricted to the one dimensional case where each lattice site is a two-dimensional complex Hilbert space (i.e., it represents a spin 1/2 particle). For simplicity here $X$ and $Z$ are normalised to each have determinant -1. The Hamiltonian possesses a $\mathbb{Z}_2$ symmetry group, as it is invariant under the unitary operation of flipping all of the spins in the $z$ direction. More precisely, the symmetry transformation is given by the unitary $\prod_j X_j$.

The 1D model admits two phases, depending on whether the ground state (specifically, in the case of degeneracy, a ground state which is not a macroscopically entangled state) breaks or preserves the aforementioned $\prod_j X_j$ spin-flip symmetry. The sign of $J$ does not impact the dynamics, as the system with positive $J$ can be mapped into the system with negative $J$ by performing a $\pi$ rotation around $X_j$ for every second site $j$.

The model can be exactly solved for all coupling constants. However, in terms of on-site spins the solution is generally very inconvenient to write down explicitly in terms of the spin variables. It is more convenient to write the solution explicitly in terms of fermionic variables defined by Jordan-Wigner transformation, in which case the excited states have a simple quasiparticle or quasihole description.

=== Ordered phase ===
When $|g|<1$, the system is said to be in the ordered phase. In this phase the ground state breaks the spin-flip symmetry. Thus, the ground state is in fact two-fold degenerate. For $J>0$ this phase exhibits ferromagnetic ordering, while for $J < 0$ antiferromagnetic ordering exists.

Precisely, if $|\psi_1 \rangle$ is a ground state of the Hamiltonian, then $|\psi_2 \rangle \equiv \prod_j X_j |\psi_1 \rangle \neq |\psi_1 \rangle$ is also a ground state, and together $|\psi_1\rangle$ and $|\psi_2 \rangle$ span the degenerate ground state space. As a simple example, when $g = 0$ and $J > 0$, the ground states are $|\ldots \uparrow \uparrow \uparrow \ldots \rangle$ and $|\ldots \downarrow \downarrow \downarrow \ldots \rangle$, that is, with all the spins aligned along the $z$ axis.

This is a gapped phase, meaning that the lowest energy excited state(s) have an energy higher than the ground state energy by a nonzero amount (nonvanishing in the thermodynamic limit). In particular, this energy gap is $2|J|(1-|g|)$.

=== Disordered phase ===
In contrast, when $|g|>1$, the system is said to be in the disordered phase. The ground state preserves the spin-flip symmetry, and is nondegenerate. As a simple example, when $g$ is infinity, the ground state is $| \ldots \rightarrow \rightarrow \rightarrow \ldots \rangle$, that is with the spin in the $+x$ direction on each site.

This is also a gapped phase. The energy gap is $2|J|(|g|-1)$.

=== Gapless phase ===
When $|g|=1$, the system undergoes a quantum phase transition. At this value of $g$, the system has gapless excitations and its low-energy behaviour is described by the two-dimensional Ising conformal field theory. This conformal theory has central charge $c=1/2$, and is the simplest of the unitary minimal models with central charge less than 1. Besides the identity operator, the theory has two primary fields, one with conformal weights $(1/16, 1/16)$ and another one with conformal weights $(1/2, 1/2)$.

== Jordan-Wigner transformation ==
It is possible to rewrite the spin variables as fermionic variables, using a highly nonlocal transformation known as the Jordan-Wigner Transformation.

A fermion creation operator on site $j$ can be defined as $c_j^\dagger = \frac{1}{2}(Z_j+iY_j)\prod_{k<j} X_k$. Then the transverse field Ising Hamiltonian (assuming an infinite chain and ignoring boundary effects) can be expressed entirely as a sum of local quadratic terms containing Creation and annihilation operators.

$H = -J \sum_j ( c_j^\dagger c_{j+1} + c_{j+1}^\dagger c_j +c_{j}^\dagger c_{j+1}^\dagger + c_{j+1} c_j + 2g(c_j^\dagger c_j-1/2))$

This Hamiltonian fails to conserve total fermion number and does not have the associated $U(1)$ global continuous symmetry, due to the presence of the $c_j^\dagger c_{j+1}^\dagger + c_{j+1}c_j$ term. However, it does conserve fermion parity. That is, the Hamiltonian commutes with the quantum operator that indicates whether the total number of fermions is even or odd, and this parity does not change under time evolution of the system. The Hamiltonian is mathematically identical to that of a superconductor in the mean field Bogoliubov-de Gennes formalism and can be completely understood in the same standard way. The exact excitation spectrum and eigenvalues can be determined by Fourier transforming into momentum space and diagonalising the Hamiltonian. In terms of Majorana fermions $a_j = c_j^\dagger + c_j$ and $b_j = -i(c_j^\dagger - c_j)$, the Hamiltonian takes on an even simpler form (up to an additive constant):

$H = i\sum_j J(a_{j+1} b_j + gb_j a_j )$.

== Kramers-Wannier duality ==
A nonlocal mapping of Pauli matrices known as the Kramers–Wannier duality transformation can be done as follows:
$$\begin{align}\tilde{X_j} &= Z_j Z_{j+1} \\
\tilde{Z}_j \tilde{Z}_{j+1} &= X_{j+1} \end{align}$$
Then, in terms of the newly defined Pauli matrices with tildes, which obey the same algebraic relations as the original Pauli matrices, the Hamiltonian is simply $H = -Jg \sum_j ( \tilde{Z}_j \tilde{Z}_{j+1} + g^{-1}\tilde{X}_{j} )$. This indicates that the model with coupling parameter $g$ is dual to the model with coupling parameter $g^{-1}$, and establishes a duality between the ordered phase and the disordered phase. In terms of the Majorana fermions mentioned above, this duality is more obviously manifested in the trivial relabeling $a_j \to b_j, b_j \to a_{j+1}$.

Note that there are some subtle considerations at the boundaries of the Ising chain; as a result of these, the degeneracy and $\mathbb{Z}_2$ symmetry properties of the ordered and disordered phases are changed under the Kramers-Wannier duality.

== Generalisations ==
The q-state quantum Potts model and the $Z_q$ quantum clock model are generalisations of the transverse field Ising model to lattice systems with $q$ states per site. The transverse field Ising model represents the case where $q = 2$ .

== Classical Ising Model ==
The quantum transverse field Ising model in $d$ dimensions is dual to an anisotropic classical Ising model in $d+1$ dimensions.
