= Kramers–Wannier duality =

Symmetry in statistical physics

The Kramers–Wannier duality is a symmetry in statistical physics. It relates the free energy of a two-dimensional square-lattice Ising model at a low temperature to that of another Ising model at a high temperature. It was discovered by Hendrik Kramers and Gregory Wannier in 1941. With the aid of this duality Kramers and Wannier found the exact location of the critical point for the Ising model on the square lattice.

Similar dualities establish relations between free energies of other statistical models. For instance, in 3 dimensions the Ising model is dual to an Ising gauge model.

== Intuitive idea ==
The 2-dimensional Ising model exists on a lattice, which is a collection of squares in a chessboard pattern. With the finite lattice, the edges can be connected to form a torus. In theories of this kind, one constructs an involutive transform. For instance, Lars Onsager suggested that the Star-Triangle transformation could be used for the triangular lattice. Now the dual of the discrete torus is itself. Moreover, the dual of a highly disordered system (high temperature) is a well-ordered system (low temperature). This is because the Fourier transform takes a high bandwidth signal (high standard deviation) to a low one (low standard deviation). So one has essentially the same theory with an inverse temperature.

When one raises the temperature in one theory, one lowers the temperature in the other. If there is only one phase transition, it will be at the point at which they cross, at which the temperatures are equal. Because the 2D Ising model goes from a disordered state to an ordered state, there is a near one-to-one mapping between the disordered and ordered phases.

The theory has been generalized, and is now blended with many other ideas. For instance, the square lattice is replaced by a circle, random lattice, nonhomogeneous torus, triangular lattice, labyrinth, lattices with twisted boundaries, chiral Potts model, and many others.

One of the consequences of Kramers–Wannier duality is an exact correspondence in the spectrum of excitations on each side of the critical point. This was recently demonstrated via THz spectroscopy in Kitaev chains.

== Derivation ==
We define first the variables. In the two-dimensional square lattice Ising model the number of horizontal and vertical links are taken to be equal. The couplings $J, J'$ of the spins $\sigma_i$ in the two directions are different, and one sets $K^*=\beta J$ and $L^* =\beta J'$ with $\beta = 1/kT$. The low temperature expansion of the $N$ spin partition function $Z_N$ for (K^{*},L^{*}) obtained from the standard expansion

$$Z_N(K^*,L^*) = 2\sum_{P \subset \Lambda_D} e^{K^*(N-2s)}e^{L^*(N-2r)}$$

is

$$Z_N(K^*,L^*) = 2 e^{N(K^*+L^*)} \sum_{ P \subset \Lambda_D} (e^{-2L^*})^r(e^{-2K^*})^s$$,

the factor 2 originating from a spin-flip symmetry for each $P$. Here the sum over $P$ stands for summation over closed polygons on the lattice resulting in the graphical correspondence from the sum over spins with values $\pm 1$.

By using the following transformation to variables $(K, L)$, i.e.

$$\tanh K = e^{-2L^*}, \ \tanh L = e^{-2K^*}$$

one obtains

$$Z_N(K^*,L^*) = 2(\tanh K \; \tanh L)^{-N/2} \sum_{P} v^r w^s$$
$$= 2(\sinh 2K \; \sinh 2L)^{-N/2} Z_N(K,L)$$

where $v = \tanh K$ and $w =\tanh L$ . This yields a mapping relation between the low temperature expansion $Z_N(K^*, L^*)$ and the high-temperature expansion $Z_N(K,L)$ described as duality (here Kramers-Wannier duality). With the help of the relations

$$\tanh 2x = \frac{2\tanh x}{1+\tanh^2x}, \; \sinh 2x = 2\sinh x\cosh x$$

the above hyperbolic tangent relations defining $K$ and $L$ can be written more symmetrically as

$$\, \sinh 2K^* \sinh 2L = 1, \;\; \sinh 2L^* \sinh 2K = 1.$$

With the free energy per site in the thermodynamic limit

$$f(K,L) = \lim_{N \rightarrow \infty} f_N(K,L) = -kT \lim_{N\rightarrow \infty} \frac{1}{N} \log Z_N(K,L)$$

the Kramers–Wannier duality gives

$$f(K^*,L^*) = f(K,L) + \frac{1}{2} kT \log(\sinh 2K \sinh 2L)$$

In the isotropic case where K = L, if there is a critical point at K = K_{c} then there is another at K = K^{*}_{c}. Hence, in the case of there being a unique critical point, it would be located at K = K^{*} = K^{*}_{c}, implying sinh 2K_{c} = 1, yielding

$$kT_c = 2.2692J$$.

The result can also be written and is obtained below as

$$e^{2K_c}= 1+\sqrt{2}.$$

== Kramers-Wannier duality in other contexts ==
The Kramers-Wannier duality appears also in other contexts. We consider here particularly the two-dimensional theory of a scalar field $\Phi.$ In this case a more convenient variable than $\sinh (2K)$is

$$s(K):= \exp(2K)\tanh(K).$$

With this expression one can construct the self-dual quantity

$$\xi^2:=\frac{s(K)}{(1-s(K))^2}=\frac{s(K^*)}{(1-s(K^*))^2}.$$

In field theory contexts the quantity $\xi$ is called correlation length. Next set

$$\beta(K):= \xi\frac{dK}{d\xi}=\frac{2s(K)(1-s(K))}{(1+s(K))[ds(K)/dK]}.$$

This function is the beta function of renormalization theory. Now suppose there is a value $K^*$ of $K$ for which $\beta(K^*) =0$, i.e. $s(K^*)=1$. The zero of the beta function is usually related to a symmetry - but only if the zero is unique. The solution of $s(K^*)=+1$ yields (obtained with MAPLE)

$$K^*= i\pi + \frac{1}{2}\ln(1+\sqrt{2}), \;\; \frac{1}{2}\ln(1+\sqrt{2}), \;\; \ln\sqrt{{1-\sqrt2}}$$.

Only the second solution is real and gives the critical value of Kramers and Wannier as

$$\exp(2K^*) = 1 +\sqrt{2}$$.

== See also ==
- Ising model
- S-duality
- Z N model
