= Quantum clock model =

Quantum lattice model

The quantum clock model is a quantum lattice model. It is a generalisation of the transverse-field Ising model . It is defined on a lattice with $N$ states on each site. The Hamiltonian of this model is

$$H = -J \left( \sum_{ \langle i, j \rangle} (Z^\dagger_i Z_j + Z_i Z^\dagger_j ) + g \sum_j (X_j + X^\dagger_j) \right)$$

Here, the subscripts refer to lattice sites, and the sum $\sum_{\langle i, j \rangle}$ is done over pairs of nearest neighbour sites $i$ and $j$. The clock matrices $X_j$ and $Z_j$ are $N \times N$ generalisations of the Pauli matrices satisfying

$Z_j X_k = e^{\frac{2\pi i }{N}\delta_{j,k}} X_k Z_j$ and $X_j^N = Z_j^N = 1$

where $\delta_{j,k}$ is 1 if $j$ and $k$ are the same site and zero otherwise. $J$ is a prefactor with dimensions of energy, and $g$ is another coupling coefficient that determines the relative strength of the external field compared to the nearest neighbor interaction.

The model obeys a global $\mathbb{Z}_N$ symmetry, which is generated by the unitary operator $U_X = \prod_j X_j$ where the product is over every site of the lattice. In other words, $U_X$ commutes with the Hamiltonian.

When $N=2$ the quantum clock model is identical to the transverse-field Ising model. When $N=3$ the quantum clock model is equivalent to the quantum three-state Potts model. When $N=4$, the model is again equivalent to the Ising model. When $N>4$, strong evidences have been found that the phase transitions exhibited in these models should be certain generalizations of Kosterlitz–Thouless transition, whose physical nature is still largely unknown.

== One-dimensional model ==
There are various analytical methods that can be used to study the quantum clock model specifically in one dimension.

=== Kramers–Wannier duality ===
A nonlocal mapping of clock matrices known as the Kramers–Wannier duality transformation can be done as follows:
$$\begin{align}\tilde{X_j} &= Z^\dagger_j Z_{j+1} \\
\tilde{Z}^\dagger_j \tilde{Z}_{j+1} &= X_{j+1} \end{align}$$
Then, in terms of the newly defined clock matrices with tildes, which obey the same algebraic relations as the original clock matrices, the Hamiltonian is simply $H = -Jg \sum_j ( \tilde{Z}^\dagger_j \tilde{Z}_{j+1} + g^{-1}\tilde{X}^\dagger_{j} + \textrm{h.c.} )$. This indicates that the model with coupling parameter $g$ is dual to the model with coupling parameter $g^{-1}$, and establishes a duality between the ordered phase and the disordered phase.

Note that there are some subtle considerations at the boundaries of the one dimensional chain; as a result of these, the degeneracy and $\mathbb{Z}_N$ symmetry properties of phases are changed under the Kramers–Wannier duality. A more careful analysis involves coupling the theory to a $\mathbb{Z}_N$ gauge field; fixing the gauge reproduces the results of the Kramers Wannier transformation.

=== Phase transition ===
For $N=2,3,4$, there is a unique phase transition from the ordered phase to the disordered phase at $g=1$. The model is said to be "self-dual" because Kramers–Wannier transformation transforms the Hamiltonian to itself. For $N>4$, there are two phase transition points at $g_1<1$ and $g_2=1/g_1>1$. Strong evidences have been found that these phase transitions should be a class of generalizations of Kosterlitz–Thouless transition. The KT transition predicts that the free energy has an essential singularity that goes like $e^{-\tfrac{c}{\sqrt{|g-g_c|}}}$, while perturbative study found that the essential singularity behaves as $e^{-\tfrac{c}{|g-g_c|^\sigma}}$ where $\sigma$ goes from $0.2$ to $0.5$ as $N$ increases from $5$ to $9$. The physical pictures of these phase transitions are still not clear.

=== Jordan–Wigner transformation ===
Another nonlocal mapping known as the Jordan Wigner transformation can be used to express the theory in terms of parafermions.
