= Transfer-matrix method (statistical mechanics) =

Mathematical technique

In statistical mechanics, the transfer-matrix method is a mathematical technique which is used to write the partition function into a simpler form. It was introduced in 1941 by Hans Kramers and Gregory Wannier. In many one dimensional lattice models, the partition function is first written as an n-fold summation over each possible microstate, and also contains an additional summation of each component's contribution to the energy of the system within each microstate.

== Overview ==
Higher-dimensional models contain even more summations. For systems with more than a few particles, such expressions can quickly become too complex to work out directly, even by computer.

Instead, the partition function can be rewritten in an equivalent way. The basic idea is to write the partition function in the form

$$\mathcal{Z} = \mathbf{v}_0 \cdot \left\{ \prod_{k=1}^N \mathbf{W}_k \right\} \cdot \mathbf{v}_{N+1}$$

where v_{0} and v_{N+1} are vectors of dimension p and the p × p matrices W_{k} are the so-called transfer matrices. In some cases, particularly for systems with periodic boundary conditions, the partition function may be written more simply as

$$\mathcal{Z} = \operatorname{tr} \left\{ \prod_{k=1}^N \mathbf{W}_k \right\}$$

where "tr" denotes the matrix trace. In either case, the partition function may be solved exactly using eigenanalysis. If the matrices are all the same matrix W, the partition function may be approximated as the N^{th} power of the largest eigenvalue of W, since the trace is the sum of the eigenvalues and the eigenvalues of the product of two diagonal matrices equals the product of their individual eigenvalues.

The transfer-matrix method is used when the total system can be broken into a sequence of subsystems that interact only with adjacent subsystems. For example, a three-dimensional cubical lattice of spins in an Ising model can be decomposed into a sequence of two-dimensional planar lattices of spins that interact only adjacently. The dimension p of the p × p transfer matrix equals the number of states the subsystem may have; the transfer matrix itself W_{k} encodes the statistical weight associated with a particular state of subsystem k − 1 being next to another state of subsystem k.

Importantly, transfer matrix methods allow to tackle probabilistic lattice models from an algebraic perspective, allowing for instance the use of results from representation theory.

As an example of observables that can be calculated from this method, the probability of a particular state $m$ occurring at position x is given by:

$$\mathrm{Pr}_m(x) =  \frac{\operatorname{tr} \left[ \prod_{k=1}^x \mathbf{W}_k \mathbf{Pj} \prod_{k'=x+1}^N \mathbf{W}_{k'}  \right]} { \operatorname{tr} \left[ \prod_{k=1}^N \mathbf{W}_k \right] }$$

Where $Pj$ is the projection matrix for state $m$, having elements $Pj_{\mu\nu} = \delta_{\mu\nu}\delta_{\mu m}$

Transfer-matrix methods have been critical for many exact solutions of problems in statistical mechanics, including the Zimm–Bragg and Lifson–Roig models of the helix-coil transition, transfer matrix models for protein-DNA binding, as well as the famous exact solution of the two-dimensional Ising model by Lars Onsager.

== See also ==
- Transfer operator
