= Helix–coil transition model =

Helix–coil transition models are formalized techniques in statistical mechanics developed to describe conformations of linear polymers in solution. The models are usually but not exclusively applied to polypeptides as a measure of the relative fraction of the molecule in an alpha helix conformation versus turn or random coil. The main attraction in investigating alpha helix formation is that one encounters many of the features of protein folding but in their simplest version. Most of the helix–coil models contain parameters for the likelihood of helix nucleation from a coil region, and helix propagation along the sequence once nucleated; because polypeptides are directional and have distinct N-terminal and C-terminal ends, propagation parameters may differ in each direction.

The two states are

- helix state: characterized by a common rotating pattern kept together by hydrogen bonds, (see alpha-helix).
- coil state: conglomerate of randomly ordered sequence of atoms (see random coil).

Common transition models include the Zimm–Bragg model and the Lifson–Roig model, and their extensions and variations.

Energy of host poly-alanine helix in aqueous solution:

$$\Delta G_\text{folding} = (m-2)\Delta H_\alpha - m T \Delta S$$

where m is number of residues in the helix.
