= Multiplicity (statistical mechanics) =

Number of microstates for a given macrostate of a thermodynamic system

In statistical mechanics, multiplicity (also called statistical weight) refers to the number of microstates corresponding to a particular macrostate of a thermodynamic system. Commonly denoted $\Omega$, it is related to the configuration entropy of an isolated system via Boltzmann's entropy formula
$$S = k_\text{B} \log \Omega,$$
where $S$ is the entropy and $k_\text{B}$ is the Boltzmann constant.

== Example: the two-state paramagnet ==
A simplified model of the two-state paramagnet provides an example of the process of calculating the multiplicity of particular macrostate. This model consists of a system of N microscopic dipoles μ which may either be aligned or anti-aligned with an externally applied magnetic field B. Let $N_\uparrow$ represent the number of dipoles that are aligned with the external field and $N_\downarrow$ represent the number of anti-aligned dipoles. The potential energy of a single aligned dipole is $U_\uparrow = -\mu B,$ while the energy of an anti-aligned dipole is $U_\downarrow = \mu B;$ thus the overall energy of the system is
$$U = (N_\downarrow-N_\uparrow)\mu B.$$

The goal is to determine the multiplicity as a function of U; from there, the entropy and other thermodynamic properties of the system can be determined. However, it is useful as an intermediate step to calculate multiplicity as a function of $N_\uparrow$ and $N_\downarrow.$ This approach shows that the number of available macrostates is N + 1. For example, in a very small system with N = 2 dipoles, there are three macrostates, corresponding to $N_\uparrow=0, 1, 2.$ Since the $N_\uparrow = 0$ and $N_\uparrow = 2$ macrostates require both dipoles to be either anti-aligned or aligned, respectively, the multiplicity of either of these states is 1. However, in the $N_\uparrow = 1,$ either dipole can be chosen for the aligned dipole, so the multiplicity is 2. In the general case, the multiplicity of a state, or the number of microstates, with $N_\uparrow$ aligned dipoles follows from combinatorics, resulting in
$$\Omega = \frac{N!}{N_\uparrow!(N-N_\uparrow)!} = \frac{N!}{N_\uparrow!N_\downarrow!},$$
where the second step follows from the fact that $N_\uparrow+N_\downarrow = N.$

Since $N_\uparrow - N_\downarrow = -\tfrac{U}{\mu B},$ the energy U can be related to $N_\uparrow$ and $N_\downarrow$ as follows:
$$\begin{align}
N_\uparrow &= \frac{N}{2} - \frac{U}{2\mu B}\\[4pt]
N_\downarrow &= \frac{N}{2} + \frac{U}{2\mu B}.
\end{align}$$

Thus the final expression for multiplicity as a function of internal energy is
$$\Omega = \frac{N!}{ \left(\frac{N}{2} - \frac{U}{2\mu B} \right)! \left( \frac{N}{2} + \frac{U}{2\mu B} \right)!}.$$

This can be used to calculate entropy in accordance with Boltzmann's entropy formula; from there one can calculate other useful properties such as temperature and heat capacity.
