= Square lattice =

2-dimensional integer lattice

Square lattices
Upright square Simple	Diagonal square Centered

Upright square tiling. The vertices of all squares together with their centers form an upright square lattice. For each color the centers of the squares of that color form a diagonal square lattice which is in linear scale √2 times as large as the upright square lattice.

In mathematics, the square lattice is a type of lattice in a two-dimensional Euclidean space. It is the two-dimensional version of the integer lattice, and is denoted as $\mathbb{Z}^2$. It is one of the five types of two-dimensional lattices as classified by their symmetry groups.

Two orientations of an image of the lattice are by far the most common. They can conveniently be referred to as the upright square lattice and diagonal square lattice; the latter is also called the centered square lattice. They differ by an angle of 45°. This is related to the fact that a square lattice can be partitioned into two square sub-lattices, as is evident in the colouring of a checkerboard.

== Symmetry ==
The square lattice's symmetry group is a wallpaper group, denoted in IUC notation as p4m, Coxeter notation as [4,4], and orbifold notation as *442. A pattern with this lattice of translational symmetry cannot have more, but may have less symmetry than the lattice itself. An upright square lattice can be viewed as a diagonal square lattice with a mesh size that is √2 times as large, with the centers of the squares added. Correspondingly, after adding the centers of the squares of an upright square lattice one obtains a diagonal square lattice with a mesh size that is √2 times as small as that of the original lattice. A pattern with 4-fold rotational symmetry has a square lattice of 4-fold rotocenters that is a factor √2 finer and diagonally oriented relative to the lattice of translational symmetry.

With respect to reflection axes there are three possibilities:

- None. This is wallpaper group p4.
- In four directions. This is wallpaper group p4m.
- In two perpendicular directions. This is wallpaper group p4g. The points of intersection of the reflexion axes form a square grid which is as fine as, and oriented the same as, the square lattice of 4-fold rotocenters, with these rotocenters at the centers of the squares formed by the reflection axes.

p4, [4,4]^{+}, (442)	p4g, [4,4^{+}], (4*2)	p4m, [4,4], (*442)
Wallpaper group p4, with the arrangement within a primitive cell of the 2- and 4-fold rotocenters (also applicable for p4g and p4m). Fundamental domain	Wallpaper group p4g. There are reflection axes in two directions, not through the 4-fold rotocenters. Fundamental domain	Wallpaper group p4m. There are reflection axes in four directions, through the 4-fold rotocenters. In two directions the reflection axes are oriented the same as, and as dense as, those for p4g, but shifted. In the other two directions they are linearly a factor √2 denser. Fundamental domain

== Crystal classes ==
The square lattice class names, Schönflies notation, Hermann-Mauguin notation, orbifold notation, Coxeter notation, and wallpaper groups are listed in the table below.

Geometric class, point group				Wallpaper groups	
Schön.	Intl	Orb.	Cox.	Wallpaper groups	
C_{4}	4	(44)	[4]^{+}	p4 (442)	
D_{4}	4mm	(*44)	[4]	p4m (*442)	p4g (4*2)

== See also ==
- Centered square number
- Euclid's orchard
- Gaussian integer
- Hexagonal lattice
- Quincunx
- Square tiling
