= Thouless =

Thouless may refer to:

== People ==
- David J. Thouless (1934–2019), British-American physicist, member of the U.S. National Academy of Sciences and 2016 recipient of the Nobel Prize in Physics
- Robert H. Thouless (1894–1984), British psychologist and parapsychologist, author of Straight and Crooked Thinking

== Other uses ==
- Thouless energy
- Kosterlitz-Thouless transition

== See also ==
- Thewlis
- Thewliss
- David Thewlis
- Alison Thewliss
- Michael Thewlis
