= SigmaPhi International Conference on Statistical Physics =

Physics conferences

- Abbreviation: SigmaPhi
- Discipline: Statistical Physics

Publication details
- Frequency: Triennial
- Website: http://www.sigmaphi.polito.it/

The SigmaPhi International Conference on Statistical Physics is a triennial conference series on statistical physics organized by the Politecnico di Torino, Italy, chaired by Giorgio Kaniadakis. The conferences, which take place every three years in Greece, are an influential forum for discussing the foundations and theoretical aspects of classical, quantum, and relativistic statistical physics and thermodynamics, as well as their applications to physical and non-physical systems. The number of participants has increased recently, coming from 52 countries in the last conference. The esteemed SigmaPhi Prizes are presented during this conference, and numerous satellite workshops and special sessions are typically conducted alongside the main event.

List of SigmaPhi Conferences
Conference	Site	Date	Notes
3rd NEXT-SigmaPhi	Kolymbari, Crete, Greece	August 13–18, 2005	
SigmaPhi 2008	Kolymbari, Crete, Greece	July 14–18, 2008	
SigmaPhi 2011	Larnaca, Cyprus	July 11–15, 2011	
SigmaPhi 2014	Rhodes, Greece	July 11–15, 2014	
SigmaPhi 2017	Corfu, Greece	July 10–14, 2017	
SigmaPhi 2023	Chania, Crete, Greece	July 10–14, 2023	
SigmaPhi 2026	Kolymbari, Crete, Greece	July 6–10, 2026	

== The SigmaPhi Prize ==
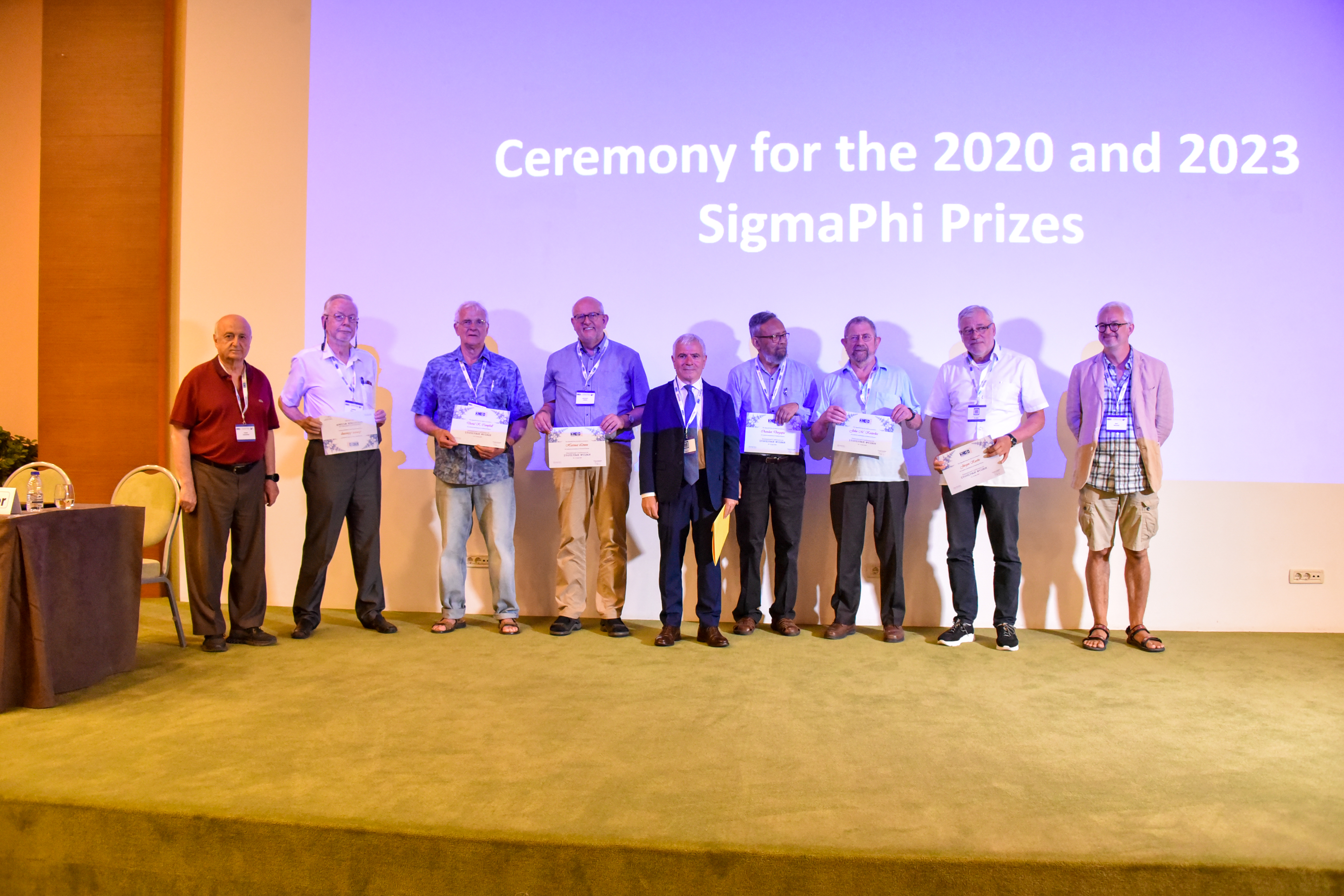
From left to right: Phanos Argirakis (Chairman of section), Amnon Aharony (SigmaPhi 2020 Prize), David K. Campbell (SigmaPhi 2020 Prize), Hartmut Löwen (SigmaPhi 2020 Prize), Giorgio Kaniadakis (Chairman of the SigmaPhi Conference), Chandan Dasgupta (SigmaPhi 2023 Prize), J. Michael Kosterlitz (SigmaPhi 2023 Prize), Jürgen Kurths (SigmaPhi 2023 Prize), Ralf Metzler (EPS-SNLP Division).

The SigmaPhi Prize was established in 2011 by the SigmaPhi Conference to honor outstanding achievements in the field of statistical physics. The award ceremony is held every three years during the opening session of the conference, and each laureate receives a diploma. The prize is primarily honorary in nature and has, to date, been awarded to scientists of the highest international standing.

Past laureates include Ralf Metzler, David Mukamel, and Stefano Ruffo (2017); Itamar Procaccia and Eugene Stanley, alongside Giorgio Parisi (2014), who was later awarded the Nobel Prize in Physics in 2021; Amnon Aharony, David K. Campbell, and Hartmut Löwen (2020); and Chandan Dasgupta, Jürgen Kurths, and John Michael Kosterlitz (2023), the latter a Nobel laureate; and Euthimios Kaxiras (Harvard University), David McComas (Princeton University), and Constantino Tsallis (Centro Brasileiro de Pesquisas Físicas, Rio de Janeiro) (2026).

== Topics covered ==
The SigmaPhi conference encompasses a diverse array of subjects in statistical physics, organized into four broad areas, alongside special sessions, workshops, and poster sessions held throughout the event.

=== Area A: Foundations and Theoretical Aspects ===
This area addresses the foundations and theoretical aspects of classical, quantum, and relativistic statistical physics and thermodynamics. Topics include mathematical methods and formalism, rigorous results and exact solutions, connections with high-energy physics and string theory, black-hole entropy, cosmological theories, information theory and information geometry, transport theory, Boltzmann and Fokker–Planck kinetics, dynamical systems, relaxation phenomena, chaotic and fractal systems, strongly correlated electrons, quantum information and entanglement, and quantum computation.

=== Area B: Applications to Physical Systems ===
This area covers applications to physical systems, including quantum systems, soft condensed matter, liquid crystals, plasmas, and fluids; disordered and glassy systems, percolation, spin glasses, and jamming; critical phenomena and phase transitions; hydrodynamic instabilities and turbulence; growth processes, wetting, and surface effects; confined systems; chemical reactions; and cold atoms.

=== Area C: Applications to non-Physical Systems ===
This area covers interdisciplinary applications of statistical physics, including networks and graphs, biophysics and genomics, environmental and climate models, seismology, linguistics, econophysics, social systems, traffic flow, complex systems, nonlinear time-series analysis, and the study of extreme events and tipping points.

=== Area D: Statistical Mechanics and Artificial Intelligence ===
This area explores the intersection of statistical mechanics and artificial intelligence, including artificial neural networks grounded in physics principles, neural networks as spin systems, Hopfield models, Boltzmann machines, and machine learning. It also covers phase transitions and self-organized criticality in AI systems, learning as free-energy minimization, thermodynamics of learning, statistical ensembles in large-scale AI models, and bioinspired models.
