= David Robert Nelson =

American physicist (born 1951)

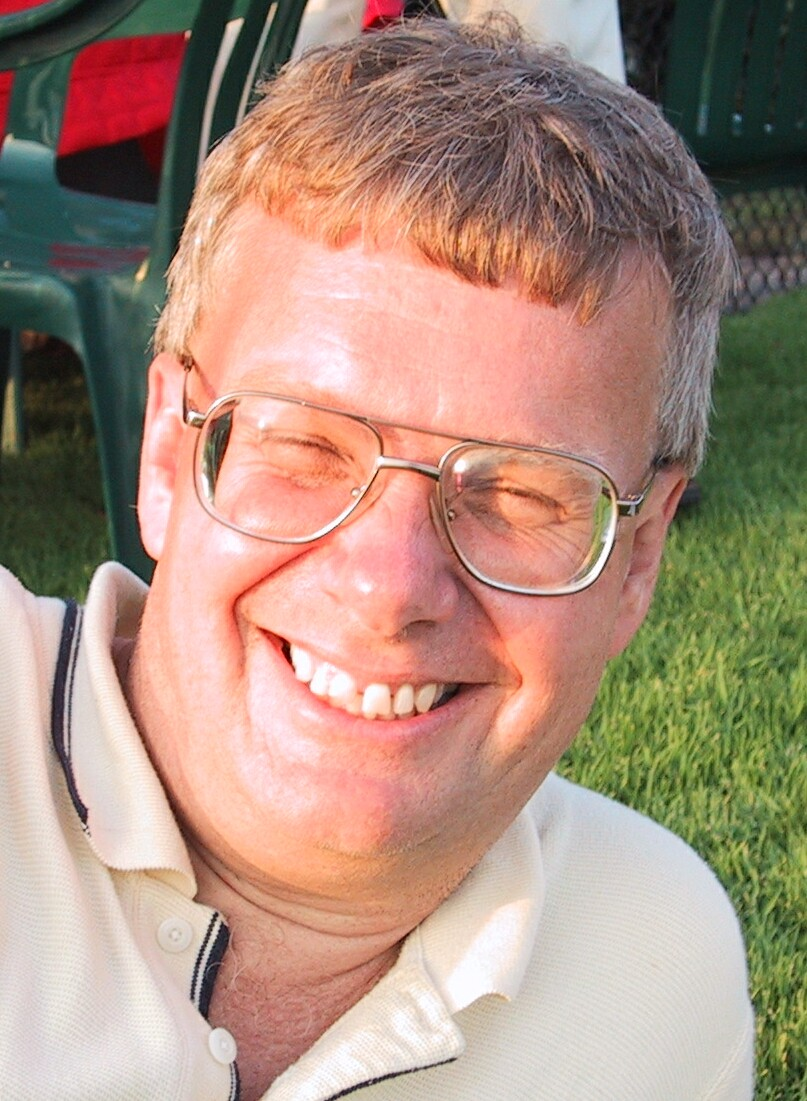
- Nelson in 2001
- Born: May 9, 1951 (age 75); Stuttgart, West Germany
- Education: Cornell University (AB, MS, PhD)
- Known for: KTHNY theory Non-Hermitian Quantum Mechanics
- Awards: Oliver Buckley Prize (2004); Niels Bohr Institute Medal of Honour (2019); John Bardeen Prize (2003)
- Scientific career
- Fields: Condensed matter physics Biophysics
- Workplaces: Harvard University
- Thesis: Applications of the Renormalization to Critical Phenomena (1975)
- Doctoral advisor: Michael Fisher
- Doctoral students: Randall Kamien; Julius Lucks; Subir Sachdev; Sebastian Seung; John Toner

David Robert Nelson (born May 9, 1951) is an American physicist, and Arthur K. Solomon Professor of Biophysics, at Harvard University. He is known for developing KTHNY theory.

== Education ==
Nelson graduated from Cornell University Summa cum laude with a double major in physics and mathematics in 1972, and received an M.S. in theoretical physics in 1974, and a Ph.D. in theoretical physics in January, 1975. He was in the fourth and final class of Cornell's short-lived "Six-year Ph.D. program". His thesis was on applications of renormalization to critical phenomena, advised by Michael Fisher.

He then became a Junior Fellow in the Harvard Society of Fellows.

Nelson is currently the Arthur K. Solomon Professor of Biophysics and Professor of Physics and Applied Physics at Harvard University.

== Research ==
Since 1978 he has been a professor at Harvard University. His research is in the fields of both hard and soft theoretical condensed matter physics, and of physical biology.

With his colleague, Bertrand Halperin, he is responsible for a theory of two-dimensional melting that predicted a fourth hexatic phase of matter, interposed between the usual solid and liquid phases. KTHNY theory is named after J. Michael Kosterlitz, David J. Thouless, Halperin and Nelson. A variety of predictions associated with this two-state freezing process have now been confirmed in experiments on two-dimensional colloidal assemblies, thin films and bulk smectic liquid crystals. Nelson's research also includes a theory of the structure and statistical mechanics of metallic glasses and investigations of tethered surfaces, which are two-dimensional generalizations of linear polymer chains. Flexural phonons lead a remarkable low temperature flat phase in these fishnet-like structures, with predictions of strongly scale-dependent elastic constants such as the two-dimensional Young's modulus and the bending rigidity of atomically or molecularly thin materials such as a free-standing sheets of graphene and molybdenum disulfide (MoS_{2}).

Nelson has also studied flux line entanglement in high temperature superconductors. At high magnetic fields, thermal fluctuations cause regular arrays of flux lines to melt into a tangled spaghetti state. The physics of this melted flux liquid resembles that of a directed polymer melt, and has important implications for both electrical transport and vortex pinning for many of the proposed applications of these new materials in strong magnetic fields. David Nelson's recent investigations have focused on problems that bridge the gap between the physical and biological sciences, including dislocation dynamics in bacterial cell walls, range expansions and genetic demixing in microorganisms and localization in asymmetric sparse neural networks. Additional recent interests include the non-Hermitian transfer matrices that describe thermally excited vortices with columnar pins in Type II superconductors, the effect of perforations, cuts and other defects on atomically thin cantilevers at finite temperatures and topological defects on curved surfaces.

== Awards ==
- 1979–1983 AP Sloan Fellowship
- 1984–1989 MacArthur Prize Fellowship
- 1986 Award for Initiatives in Research from the National Academy of Sciences
- 1987 Elected Fellow of the American Physical Society
- 1993–1994 Guggenheim Fellowship
- 1995 Harvard Ledlie Prize, Harvard University
- 2001 Welsh Lectures, University of Toronto
- 2003 John Bardeen Prize (for research in superconductivity)
- 2004 Oliver E. Buckley Condensed Matter Prize
- 2004 Mary Upson Visiting professor, Cornell University
- 2005 Mayent-Rothschild Visiting professor, Curie Institute, Paris
- 2006 Sommerfeld Lecturer, LMU Munich
- 2006 Lorentz Visiting Professor, Leiden University
- 2007 Mark Kac Memorial Lecturer, Los Alamos National Laboratory
- 2007 Primakoff Lecturer, University of Pennsylvania
- 2009 Visiting professor, Niels Bohr Institute, Copenhagen
- 2010 Kavli Lectureship, Delft University
- 2013 KITP Simons Distinguished Visiting Scholar, UCSB
- 2019 Niels Bohr Institute Medal of Honor

== Notable works ==
- Nelson, David R.; Kosterlitz, J. M. (1977-11-07). "Universal Jump in the Superfluid Density of Two-Dimensional Superfluids". Physical Review Letters. 39 (19). American Physical Society (APS): 1201–1205. Bibcode:1977PhRvL..39.1201N. doi:10.1103/physrevlett.39.1201. ISSN 0031-9007.
- Nelson, David R.; Halperin, B. I. (1979-03-01). "Dislocation-mediated melting in two dimensions". Physical Review B. 19 (5). American Physical Society (APS): 2457–2484. Bibcode:1979PhRvB..19.2457N. doi:10.1103/physrevb.19.2457. ISSN 0163-1829.
- Nelson, David R. (1983-11-15). "Order, frustration, and defects in liquids and glasses". Physical Review B. 28 (10). American Physical Society (APS): 5515–5535. Bibcode:1983PhRvB..28.5515N. doi:10.1103/physrevb.28.5515. ISSN 0163-1829.
- Nelson, D.R.; Peliti, L. (1987). "Fluctuations in membranes with crystalline and hexatic order". Journal de Physique. 48 (7). EDP Sciences: 1085–1092. doi:10.1051/jphys:019870048070108500. ISSN 0302-0738.
- Nelson, David R. (1988-05-09). "Vortex Entanglement in High-T_{c} Superconductors". Physical Review Letters. 60 (19). American Physical Society (APS): 1973–1976. Bibcode:1988PhRvL..60.1973N. doi:10.1103/physrevlett.60.1973. ISSN 0031-9007. PMID 10038191.
- Nelson, David R.; Vinokur, V. M. (1993-11-01). "Boson localization and correlated pinning of superconducting vortex arrays". Physical Review B. 48 (17). American Physical Society (APS): 13060–13097. Bibcode:1993PhRvB..4813060N. doi:10.1103/physrevb.48.13060. ISSN 0163-1829. PMID 10007683.
- Hatano, Naomichi; Nelson, David R. (1997-10-01). "Vortex pinning and non-Hermitian quantum mechanics". Physical Review B. 56 (14). American Physical Society (APS): 8651–8673. arXiv:cond-mat/9705290. Bibcode:1997PhRvB..56.8651H. doi:10.1103/physrevb.56.8651. ISSN 0163-1829. S2CID 119068115.
- Nelson, David R.; Shnerb, Nadav M. (1998-08-01). "Non-Hermitian localization and population biology". Physical Review E. 58 (2). American Physical Society (APS): 1383–1403. arXiv:cond-mat/9708071. Bibcode:1998PhRvE..58.1383N. doi:10.1103/physreve.58.1383. ISSN 1063-651X. S2CID 15530681.
- Lubensky, David K.; Nelson, David R. (2002-03-06). "Single molecule statistics and the polynucleotide unzipping transition". Physical Review E. 65 (3) 031917. American Physical Society (APS). arXiv:cond-mat/0107423. Bibcode:2002PhRvE..65c1917L. doi:10.1103/physreve.65.031917. ISSN 1063-651X. PMID 11909119. S2CID 14265362.
- Lidmar, Jack, Leonid Mirny, and David R. Nelson. "Virus shapes and buckling transitions in spherical shells." Physical Review E 68, no. 5 (2003): 051910. DOI: https://doi.org/10.1103/PhysRevE.68.051910
- Hallatschek, Oskar, Pascal Hersen, Sharad Ramanathan, and David R. Nelson. "Genetic drift at expanding frontiers promotes gene segregation." Proceedings of the National Academy of Sciences 104, no. 50 (2007): 19926-19930. https://doi.org/10.1073/pnas.0710150104
- Müller, Melanie JI, Beverly I. Neugeboren, David R. Nelson, and Andrew W. Murray. "Genetic drift opposes mutualism during spatial population expansion." Proceedings of the National Academy of Sciences 111, no. 3 (2014): 1037-1042. https://doi.org/10.1073/pnas.1313285111
