= 2016 Nobel Prizes =

The 2016 Nobel Prizes were awarded by the Nobel Foundation, based in Sweden. Six categories were awarded: Physics, Chemistry, Physiology or Medicine, Literature, Peace, and Economic Sciences.

Nobel Week took place from December 6 to 12, including programming such as lectures, dialogues, and discussions. The award ceremony and banquet for the Peace Prize were scheduled in Oslo on December 10, while the award ceremony and banquet for all other categories were scheduled for the same day in Stockholm.

== Prizes ==
=== Physics ===
Awardee(s)
David J. Thouless (1934–2019)	British	"for theoretical discoveries of topological phase transitions and topological phases of matter"
Duncan Haldane (b. 1951)	British	"for theoretical discoveries of topological phase transitions and topological phases of matter"
John M. Kosterlitz (b. 1943)	British American	"for theoretical discoveries of topological phase transitions and topological phases of matter"

=== Chemistry ===
Awardee(s)
Jean-Pierre Sauvage (b. 1944)	French	"for the design and synthesis of molecular machines"
Fraser Stoddart (1942-2024)	British American	"for the design and synthesis of molecular machines"
Ben Feringa (b. 1951)	Dutch	"for the design and synthesis of molecular machines"

=== Physiology or Medicine ===
Awardee(s)
Yoshinori Ohsumi (b. 1945)	Japan	"for his discoveries of mechanisms for autophagy"

=== Literature ===
Awardee(s)		
Bob Dylan (b. 1941)	United States	"for having created new poetic expressions within the great American song tradition"

=== Peace ===
Awardee(s)
Juan Manuel Santos (born 1951)	Colombia	"for his resolute efforts to bring the country's more than 50-year-long civil war to an end."

=== Economic Sciences ===
Awardee(s)
Oliver Hart (b. 1948)	British American	“for his contributions to contract theory”
Bengt Holmström (b. 1949)	Finland	“for his contributions to contract theory”

== Controversies ==
=== Literature ===
Dylan's award for the Literature Prize was questioned; some stated that it was done out of Dylan's popularity rather than any virtuosic quality about his work, while others found that giving the award to a songwriter-musician diminished its reputation. Karl Ove Knausgård told The Guardian: "I'm very divided. I love that the Nobel committee opens up for other kinds of literature—lyrics and so on. I think that's brilliant. But knowing that Dylan is the same generation as Thomas Pynchon, Philip Roth, Cormac McCarthy, makes it very difficult for me to accept it."
