= Vadim Berezinskii =

Soviet physicist (1935–1980)

Vadim L'vovich Berezinskii
- Вадим Львович Березинский
- Born: 15 July 1935; Kiev, Ukrainian SSR, Soviet Union
- Died: 23 June 1980 (aged 44)
- Education: Moscow State University
- Known for: Berezinskii–Kosterlitz–Thouless transition Mermin–Wagner–Berezinskii theorem
- Scientific career
- Fields: Condensed matter physics
- Workplaces: Landau Institute for Theoretical Physics

Vadim L'vovich Berezinskii (July 15, 1935, in Kiev – June 23, 1980, in Moscow) was a Soviet physicist.

He was born in Kiev and graduated from Moscow State University in 1959. He then worked in Moscow and the Landau Institute for Theoretical Physics. He is notable for having identified the role played by topological defects in the low-temperature phase of two-dimensional systems with a continuous symmetry. His work led to the discovery of the Berezinskii–Kosterlitz–Thouless transition, for which John M. Kosterlitz and David J. Thouless were awarded the Nobel Prize in 2016. He also developed a technique for treating electrons in one-dimensional disordered systems and provided first consistent proof of one-dimensional localization, and predicted negative-gap superconductivity.

== See also ==
- Mermin–Wagner–Berezinskii theorem
