= Kosterlitz =

Kosterlitz is a surname. Notable people with the surname include:

- Hans Kosterlitz (1903–1996), German-British biologist
- Hermann Kosterlitz, birthname of Henry Koster (1905–1988), German-American film director
- J. Michael Kosterlitz (born 1943), Nobel Prize winning professor of physics
