= WHH =

WHH may refer to:

- William Henry Harrison (1773–1841), ninth president of the United States (1841)
- William Hope Harvey (1851–1936), advocate of bimetallism and founder of Monte Ne, Arkansas
- "Whatever Happened, Happened", an episode of the television series Lost
- Welthungerhilfe, a German non-governmental aid agency
- Werthamer–Helfand–Hohenberg theory of superconductivity
- Welcome Home Heroes, a televised concert by Whitney Houston
- Wilman Wadandi Highway, highway in Western Australia
