= Pierre Hohenberg =

French American physicist (1934-2017)

- Born: Pierre Claude Hohenberg; 3 October 1934; Neuilly-sur-Seine, France
- Died: 15 December 2017 (aged 83)
- Known for: Hohenberg–Kohn theorems Hohenberg–Mermin–Wagner theorem Swift–Hohenberg equation Werthamer–Helfand–Hohenberg theory
- Awards: Lars Onsager Prize (2003); Max Planck Medal (1999); Fritz London Memorial Lecture (1990)
- Scientific career
- Institutions: Institute for Physical Problems; New York University; Yale University
- Thesis: Excitations in a Dilute Condensed Bose Gas (1956)
- Doctoral advisor: Paul C. Martin

Pierre Hohenberg (3 October 1934 – 15 December 2017) was a French-American theoretical physicist, who worked primarily on statistical mechanics.

The Hohenberg–Kohn theorems, formulated by Hohenberg and Walter Kohn gave rise to the density functional theory (DFT). He is also known for the development of dynamic scaling theory of critical phenomena, along with Bertrand Halperin.

== Academic life ==
Pierre Claude Hohenberg studied at Harvard University, where he earned his bachelor's degree in 1956 and a master's degree in 1958 (after a stay during 1956/57 at École Normale Supérieure), and his doctorate in 1962.

From 1962 to 1963, he was at the Institute for Physical Problems in Moscow, followed by a stay at the École Normale Supérieure in Paris. From 1964 to 1995 he was at Bell Laboratories in Murray Hill. From 1985 to 1989, he was director of the department of theoretical physics and from 1989 to 1995 was "Distinguished Member of Technical Staff". From 1974 to 1977, he was also professor of theoretical physics at the Technical University of Munich, where he had previously been a guest professor in 1972–1973. From 1995 to 2003, he was "Deputy Provost of Science and Technology" at Yale University. Subsequently, he was the Yale "Eugene Higgins Adjunct Professor of Physics and Applied Physics". Hohenberg was additionally from 1963 to 1964 and again in 1988 guest professor in Paris and in 1990–1991 a Lorentz-Professor in Leiden. In 2004, he became Senior Vice Provost of Research at New York University, a position held until 2011, when he stepped down to join the Physics Department as Professor. In 2012, he became emeritus Professor of Physics at NYU.

=== Research ===
Hohenberg formulated in 1964 with Walter Kohn the Hohenberg–Kohn theorem in the course of his work on density functional theory.He became famous primarily for his investigations in the 1960s and 1970s in the theory of dynamic (i.e. temporally variable) critical phenomena close to phase transitions. He collaborated thereby with Bertrand Halperin, Shang-keng Ma and Eric Siggia in the application of renormalization methods. Additionally, Hohenberg worked (with Swift) on hydrodynamic instabilities, on the Swift–Hohenberg equation and on pattern formation in non-equilibrium systems with Michael Cross.

Preceding David Mermin and Herbert Wagner he proved in 1967 the impossibility of spontaneous symmetry breaking in one and two dimensions, now known as the Hohenberg–Mermin–Wagner theorem. Mermin and Wagner published an alternative proof of the theorem for magnetic systems based on Hohenberg's work, but Mermin and Wagner published it first in 1966, citing the unpublished work of Hohenberg.

With N. Richard Werthamer and Eugene Helfand, Hohenberg came up with the Werthamer–Helfand–Hohenberg theory in 1966 to model type-II superconductors. In collaboration with Richard Friedberg, he presented a new formulation of nonrelativistic quantum mechanics based on the consistent histories approach to the interpretation of quantum mechanics.

== Fellowships and awards ==
Hohenberg was also politically active. In 1983, he chaired the committee of the American Physical Society for the freedom of scientists and in 1992–1993 on an APS committee for the support of scientists in the Soviet Union. From 1984 to 1996, he was a member of the committee for human rights of the New York Academy of Sciences. Hohenberg was a fellow of the American Academy of Arts and Sciences (since 1985), the National Academy of Sciences (from 1989), the American Philosophical Society (since 2014) and the New York Institute for the Humanities (since 2016).

He received several prizes including

- 1990 Fritz London Memorial Prize,
- 1999 Max Planck Medal,
- and 2003 Lars Onsager Prize.

== Selected works ==
- Hohenberg, P.; Kohn, W. (1964-11-09). "Inhomogeneous Electron Gas". Physical Review. 136 (3B): B864–B871. doi:10.1103/PhysRev.136.B864. ISSN 0031-899X.
- Halperin, B. I.; Hohenberg, P. C. (1967-09-18). "Generalization of Scaling Laws to Dynamical Properties of a System Near its Critical Point". Physical Review Letters. 19 (12): 700–703. doi:10.1103/PhysRevLett.19.700. ISSN 0031-9007.
- Halperin, B. I.; Hohenberg, P. C. (1969-01-10). "Scaling Laws for Dynamic Critical Phenomena". Physical Review. 177 (2): 952–971. doi:10.1103/PhysRev.177.952. ISSN 0031-899X.
- Halperin, B. I.; Hohenberg, P. C.; Ma, Shang-keng (1972-12-04). "Calculation of Dynamic Critical Properties Using Wilson's Expansion Methods". Physical Review Letters. 29 (23): 1548–1551. doi:10.1103/PhysRevLett.29.1548. ISSN 0031-9007.
- Swift, J.; Hohenberg, P. C. (1977-01-01). "Hydrodynamic fluctuations at the convective instability". Physical Review A. 15 (1): 319–328. doi:10.1103/PhysRevA.15.319. ISSN 0556-2791.
- Hohenberg, P. C. (1967-06-10). "Existence of Long-Range Order in One and Two Dimensions". Physical Review. 158 (2): 383–386. doi:10.1103/PhysRev.158.383. ISSN 0031-899X.
- P. C. Hohenberg: Dynamical theory of critical phenomena, in E. G. D. Cohen (Ed.) "Statistical mechanics at the turn of the decade", Dekker, New York 1971.
- Hohenberg, P. C.; Halperin, B. I. (1977-07-01). "Theory of dynamic critical phenomena". Reviews of Modern Physics. 49 (3): 435–479. doi:10.1103/RevModPhys.49.435. ISSN 0034-6861.
- Cross, M. C.; Hohenberg, P. C. (1993-07-01). "Pattern formation outside of equilibrium". Reviews of Modern Physics. 65 (3): 851–1112. doi:10.1103/RevModPhys.65.851. ISSN 0034-6861.
- Friedberg, R; Hohenberg, P C (2014-09-01). "Compatible quantum theory". Reports on Progress in Physics. 77 (9) 092001. arXiv:1405.1961. doi:10.1088/0034-4885/77/9/092001. ISSN 0034-4885.

== See also ==
- Critical phenomena
- Dynamic scaling
