= Disclination =

Angular defect in a material

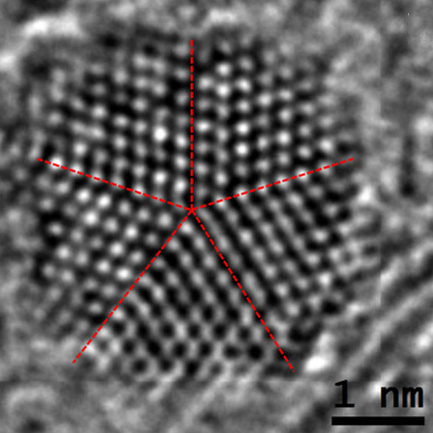
Decahedral PtFe1.2 nanoparticle.

In crystallography, a disclination is a line defect in which there is compensation of an angular gap. They were first discussed by Vito Volterra in 1907, who provided an analysis of the elastic strains of a wedge disclination. By analogy to dislocations in crystals, the term, disinclination, was first used by Charles Frank and since then has been modified to its current usage, disclination. As pointed out by John D. Eshelby, there is an intricate connection between disclinations and dislocations, with dislocation motion moving the position of a disclination.

Disclinations occur in many different materials, including liquid crystals, nanoparticles with decahedral or icosahedral symmetries, and in elastically distorted materials.

== Types ==
Disclinations are characterized by an angular vector, called a Frank vector (similarly to Burgers vector in dislocations), and the disclination line. When the Frank vector and the disclination line are perpendicular, they are called twist disclinations (similarly to edge dislocations). When the vector and the disclination line are parallel, they are called wedge disclinations (similarly to screw dislocations), which are common in decahedral nanoparticles.

== Example in two dimensions ==
Formation of two disclinations (right) out of a dislocation (left) on an otherwise hexagonal background

In 2D, disclinations and dislocations are point defects instead of line defects as in 3D. They are topological defects and play a central role in melting of 2D crystals within the KTHNY theory, based on two Kosterlitz–Thouless transitions.

Equally sized discs (spheres, particles, atoms) form a hexagonal crystal as dense packing in two dimensions. In such a crystal, each particle has six nearest neighbors. Local strain and twist (for example induced by thermal motion) can cause configurations where discs (or particles) have a coordination number different of six, typically five or seven. Disclinations are topological defects, therefore (starting from a hexagonal array) they can only be created in pairs. Ignoring surface/border effects, this implies that there are always as many 5-folded as 7-folded disclinations present in a perfectly plane 2D crystal. A "bound" pair of 5-7-folded disclinations is a dislocation. If myriad dislocations are thermally dissociated into isolated disclinations, then the monolayer of particles becomes an isotropic fluid in two dimensions. A 2D crystal is free of disclinations.

To transform a section of a hexagonal array into a 5-folded disclination (colored green in the figure), a triangular wedge of hexagonal elements (blue triangle) has to be removed; to create a 7-folded disclination (orange), an identical wedge must be inserted. The figure illustrates how disclinations destroy orientational order, while dislocations only destroy translational order in the far field (portions of the crystal far from the center of the disclination).

Disclinations are topological defects because they cannot be created locally by an affine transformation without cutting the hexagonal array outwards to infinity (or the border of a finite crystal). The undisturbed hexagonal crystal has a 60° symmetry, but when a wedge is removed to create a 5-folded disclination, the crystal symmetry is stretched to 72° – for a 7-folded disclination, it is compressed to about 51,4°. Thus, disclinations store elastic energy by disturbing the director field.

== See also ==
- Hexatic phase – Two-dimensional state of matter
- Fiveling – Five crystals arranged around a common axis
