= Ralf Metzler =

German physicist

- Born: 13 October 1968 (age 57); Neuenbürg, West Germany
- Education: University of Ulm
- Known for: Anomalous diffusion; Nonequilibrium statistical mechanics
- Scientific career
- Fields: Physics
- Workplaces: University of Potsdam
- Doctoral advisor: Theo F. Nonnenmacher
- Other academic advisors: Joseph Klafter; Mehran Kardar

Ralf Metzler (born 13 October 1968) is a physicist that focuses on nonequilibrium statistical physics and anomalous stochastic processes, with applications to biological and soft matter systems. He currently is chair professor for theoretical physics at the University of Potsdam and is an Alexander von Humboldt Polish Honorary Research Fellow.

== Education ==
Metzler holds a Diploma (magna cum laude) degree in physics (1994) and a PhD (summa cum laude, 1996) from the University of Ulm. He performed postdoctoral research at Tel Aviv University with Joseph Klafter and Massachusetts Institute of Technology with Mehran Kardar.

== Academic career ==
Metzler became an assistant professor at the Nordic Institute for Theoretical Physics (NORDITA) in Copenhagen in 2002. He later spend a period of time in Canada, where he was appointed Canada Research Chair in Biological Physics at the University of Ottawa and he moved to the Technical University of Munich as a professor. Since 2011, he is chair professor for theoretical physics at the University of Potsdam and is an Alexander von Humboldt Polish Honorary Research Fellow.

== Awards ==
- Feodor Lynen Fellow, Alexander von Humboldt Foundation
- Amos de Shalit Fellow, Minerva Foundation
- Emmy Noether Fellow, Deutsche Forschungsgemeinschaft
- Canada Research Chair in Biological Physics
- Finland Distinguished Professor (FiDiPro)
- Outstanding Referee by the American Physical Society
- Sigma Phi Prize
