= Catherine Kallin =

Canadian theoretical physicist

- Born: Vancouver, British Columbia, Canada

Academic background
- Education: Langara College; University of British Columbia (BSc); Harvard University (PhD)
- Thesis: Some Dynamic Electronic Properties of Semiconductor Surfaces and Interfaces (1984)
- Doctoral advisor: Bertrand Halperin

Academic work
- Discipline: Physicist

Catherine Kallin is a Canadian theoretical quantum condensed matter physicist whose research topics have included spin wave theory, the quantum Hall effect, frustrated antiferromagnets, chirality in superconductors, and high-temperature superconductivity. She is a professor emerita of physics and astronomy at McMaster University.

== Education and career ==
Kallin is originally from Vancouver, where she was an undergraduate at Langara College and the University of British Columbia (UBC), graduating from UBC in 1979. She was turned off from physics in her high school education, but regained interest after taking a general-interest physics course at Langara.

She completed her Ph.D. in physics at Harvard University in 1984. Her dissertation, Some Dynamic Electronic Properties of Semiconductor Surfaces and Interfaces, was supervised by Bertrand Halperin. After postdoctoral research at the Kavli Institute for Theoretical Physics at the University of California, Santa Barbara, she became an assistant professor at McMaster University in 1986.

== Recognition ==
In 1994, Kallin was named a Fellow of the American Physical Society (APS), after a nomination from the APS Division of Condensed Matter Physics, "for contributions to the understanding of correlations between electrons in low-dimensional systems".

Kallin was awarded a Sloan Research Fellowship in 1987. She became a Guggenheim Fellow in 1996, and was awarded the 1996 E.W.R. Steacie Memorial Fellowship of the Natural Sciences and Engineering Research Council. Kallin was given a Tier 1 Canada Research Chair in Quantum Materials Theory in 2003, renewed in 2010. She won a Killam Research Fellowship from the Canada Council for the Arts in 2013, and a Simons Fellowship in 2016, the only Canadian winner in that year.

Langara College gave her their outstanding alumni award in 2016.
