= Herbert Wagner (physicist) =

German theoretical physicist

Herbert Wagner (born 6 April 1935) is a German theoretical physicist, who mainly works in statistical mechanics. He is a professor emeritus of LMU Munich.

== Biography ==
Wagner was one of the last students of German theoretical physicist and Nobel Prize winner Werner Heisenberg, with whom he worked on magnetism.

As a postdoc at Cornell University, he and David Mermin (and independently of Pierre Hohenberg) proved a "no-go theorem", otherwise known as the Mermin–Wagner theorem. The theorem states that continuous symmetries cannot be spontaneously broken at finite temperature in systems with sufficiently short-range interactions in dimensions $d \le 2$.

Wagner is the academic father of a generation of statistical physicists. Many of his students and junior collaborators now occupy chairs in German universities, including Hans Werner Diehl (Essen), Siegfried Dietrich (Wuppertal, then Max-Planck-Institut für Metallforschung Stuttgart), Gerhard Gompper (Forschungszentrum Jülich), Reinhard Lipowsky (Max Planck Institute of Colloids and Interfaces, Berlin), Hartmut Löwen (Düsseldorf), Klaus Mecke (Erlangen), and Udo Seifert (Stuttgart).

== Awards ==
In 1992, Wagner was awarded an honorary degree by the University of Essen (now University of Duisburg-Essen). In 2016 he received the Max Planck Medal for his fundamental works on the statistical physics of low-dimensional systems.
