= Randall Kamien =

American physicist

Randall David Kamien
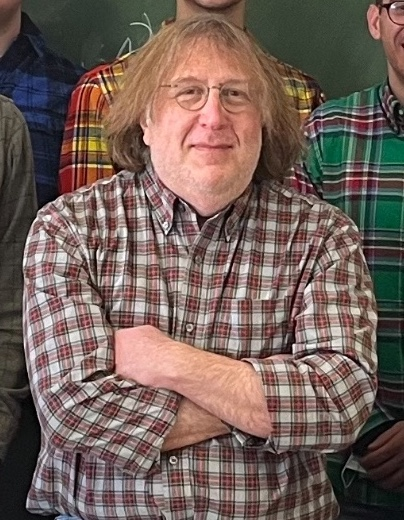
- Kamien in 2022
- Education: California Institute of Technology (B.S., 1988); California Institute of Technology (M.S., 1988); Harvard University (Ph.D, 1992)
- Known for: Grain boundaries Focal conic domains Liquid crystals
- Awards: G.W. Gray Medal British Liquid Crystal Society (2016)
- Scientific career
- Fields: Condensed Matter Physics
- Workplaces: Harvard University; Institute for Advanced Study; University of Pennsylvania
- Thesis: Directed Line Liquids (1992)
- Doctoral advisor: David R. Nelson

Randall David Kamien is a theoretical condensed matter physicist specializing in the physics of liquid crystals and is the Vicki and William Abrams Professor in the Natural Sciences at the University of Pennsylvania.

== Biography ==
Randall Kamien is the son of economist Morton Kamien and his wife Lenore. Kamien completed a B.S. and a M.S. in physics at the California Institute of Technology in 1988 and completed a PhD in physics at Harvard University in 1992 under the supervision of David R. Nelson. Prior to joining the faculty at the University of Pennsylvania he was a member of the Institute for Advanced Study in Princeton, New Jersey, and a postdoctoral research associate at the University of Pennsylvania. Kamien was appointed assistant professor at the University of Pennsylvania in 1997 and promoted to full professor in 2003. Kamien is a fellow of the American Physical Society and the American Association for the Advancement of Science. Kamien was the chief editor of Reviews of Modern Physics.

== Research ==
Randall Kamien studies soft condensed matter – and in particular liquid crystalline phases of matter – through the lens of geometry and topology. In particular, Kamien has contributed to understanding Twist Grain Boundaries, Focal Conic Domains, and defect topology in smectic liquid crystals. He is also known for his idiosyncratic naming conventions, such as "Shnerk's Surface" and "Shmessel Functions."

== Publications ==
- Senyuk, B.; Liu, Q.; He, S.; Kamien, R. D.; Kusner, R. B.; Lubensky, T. C.; Smalyukh, I. I. (2013), "Topological colloids", Nature, 493 (7431): 200–205, arXiv:1612.08753, Bibcode:2013Natur.493..200S, doi:10.1038/nature11710, PMID 23263182, S2CID 4343186.
- Honglawan, A.; Beller, D. A.; Cavallaro, M.; Kamien, R. D.; Stebe, K. J.; Yang, S. (2013), "Topographically induced hierarchical assembly and geometrical transformation of focal conic domain arrays in smectic liquid crystals", Proceedings of the National Academy of Sciences, 110 (1): 34–39, doi:10.1073/pnas.1214708109, PMC 3538202, PMID 23213240.
- Snir, Y.; Kamien, R. D. (2005), "Entropically driven helix formation", Science, 307 (5712): 1067, arXiv:cond-mat/0502520, doi:10.1126/science.1106243, PMID 15718461, S2CID 14611285.
- Ziherl, P.; Kamien, R. D. (2001), "Maximizing entropy by minimizing area: Towards a new principle of self-organization", The Journal of Physical Chemistry B, 105 (42): 10147, arXiv:cond-mat/0103171, doi:10.1021/jp010944q, S2CID 119467204.
- Kamien, R. D.; Selinger, J. V. (2001), "Order and frustration in chiral liquid crystals", Journal of Physics: Condensed Matter, 13 (3): R1, arXiv:cond-mat/0009094, doi:10.1088/0953-8984/13/3/201, S2CID 93442372.
- Kamien, R. D.; Lubensky, T. C. (1999), "Minimal surfaces, screw dislocations, and twist grain boundaries", Physical Review Letters, 82 (14): 2892, arXiv:cond-mat/9808306, Bibcode:1999PhRvL..82.2892K, doi:10.1103/PhysRevLett.82.2892, S2CID 15354995.
