= Julius Lucks =

American chemical and biological engineer

Julius B. Lucks
- Education: University of North Carolina at Chapel Hill (BS); University of Cambridge (MPhil); Harvard University (PhD)
- Known for: SHAPE-Seq, Cell-free biosensors, RNA folding design
- Scientific career
- Fields: Synthetic biology, Chemical engineering, RNA
- Doctoral advisor: David Robert Nelson
- Website: luckslab.org

Julius B. Lucks is an American chemical and biological engineer and the Margery Claire Carlson Professor of Chemical and Biological Engineering at Northwestern University. He is known for his research in synthetic biology, particularly in the areas of RNA engineering and the development of low-cost, cell-free biosensors for environmental monitoring. A Guggenheim Fellow and AAAS Fellow, his work integrates biophysics and artificial intelligence to predict molecular folding.

== Education ==
Lucks attended the North Carolina School of Science and Mathematics. He graduated from the University of North Carolina at Chapel Hill with a B.S. in Chemistry as a Goldwater Scholar. As a Churchill Scholar, he obtained an M.Phil. in Chemistry from the University of Cambridge.

He completed his graduate studies at Harvard University, earning an M.S. and a Ph.D. in Chemical Physics under David Robert Nelson. His doctoral research focused on viral genome organization using theoretical physics.

== Career ==
Lucks was a Miller Fellow at the University of California, Berkeley in the laboratory of Adam P. Arkin, where he co-developed SHAPE-Seq, a method for high-throughput RNA structure probing.

In 2011, he joined Cornell University as an Assistant Professor. In 2016, he moved to Northwestern University, where he serves as Professor and Co-Director of the Center for Synthetic Biology. In 2019, he co-founded Stemloop, Inc. to commercialize biosensing technologies developed at Northwestern.

== Research ==
The Lucks Group focuses on two primary areas:

- RNA Design and AI: Using deep learning and experimental pipelines to predict and design RNA folding processes.
- Biosensing Technologies: Engineering cell-free systems for point-of-use diagnostics. These sensors have been field-tested for monitoring water quality in Chicago and Kenya.

== Awards and honors ==
- Fellow, American Association for the Advancement of Science (2025)
- Guggenheim Fellowship (2023)
- Fellow, American Institute for Medical and Biological Engineering (2022)
- Camille Dreyfus Teacher-Scholar Award (2017)
- NSF CAREER Award (2015)
- NIH New Innovator Award (2013)
- Sloan Research Fellowship (2013)
