= Chaos (journal) =

- Discipline: Nonlinear dynamics
- Language: English
- Edited by: Jürgen Kurths

Publication details
- History: 1991–present
- Publisher: American Institute of Physics
- Frequency: Quarterly
- Impact factor: 3.267 (2020)

Standard abbreviations
- ISO 4: Chaos

Indexing
- CODEN: CHAOEH
- ISSN: 1054-1500 (print); 1089-7682 (web)
- LCCN: 91657086
- OCLC no.: 35131011

Links
- Journal homepage; Online archive

Chaos: An Interdisciplinary Journal of Nonlinear Science is a monthly peer-reviewed scientific journal covering nonlinear systems and describing their manifestations in a manner comprehensible to researchers from a broad spectrum of disciplines. The editor-in-chief is Jürgen Kurths of the Potsdam Institute for Climate Impact Research.

== Abstracting and indexing ==
The journal is abstracted and indexed in the Science Citation Index and Current Contents/Physical Chemical and Earth Sciences. According to the Journal Citation Reports, the journal has a 2020 impact factor of 3.267.
