= Genetic demixing =

In biology, genetic demixing refers to a phenomenon in which an initial mixture of individuals with two or more distinct genotypes rearranges in the course of time, giving birth to a spatial organization where some or all genotypes are concentrated in distinct patches.

== See also ==
- Population genetics
- Microbiology
- Genomics
- Ecology
- Microbial ecology
- Genetic admixture
