= Thouless energy =

The Thouless energy is a characteristic energy scale of diffusive disordered conductors. It was first introduced by the Scottish-American physicist David J. Thouless when studying Anderson localization, as a measure of the sensitivity of energy levels to a change in the boundary conditions of the system. Though being a classical quantity, it has been shown to play an important role in the quantum-mechanical treatment of disordered systems.

It is defined by

$$E_{\rm T} = \frac{\hbar D}{L^2}$$,

where D is the diffusion constant and L the size of the system, and thereby inversely proportional to the diffusion time

$$t_D = \frac{L^2}{D}$$

through the system.
