= Hans Kosterlitz =

British biochemist (1903–1996)

- Born: Hans Walter Kosterlitz; 27 April 1903; Berlin
- Died: 26 October 1996 (aged 93)
- Education: Humboldt University of Berlin
- Known for: Endorphins
- Spouse: Johanna Greßhöner
- Awards: Harvey Prize (1981); Fellow of the Royal Society (1978); Royal Medal (1979); Cameron Prize for Therapeutics of the University of Edinburgh (1988)
- Fields: Biochemistry
- Workplaces: University of Aberdeen

Hans Walter Kosterlitz FRS (27 April 1903 – 26 October 1996) was a German-born British biochemist.

== Biography ==
Hans Walter Kosterlitz was born on 27 April 1903 in Berlin. He was the elder son of Bernhard Kosterlitz, a physician, and Selma Helena Lepman.

Kosterlitz's father had recommended a career in law. He gave it a try for six months at the University of Berlin, but then switched to medicine. He graduated in 1928 and worked in the department of Wilhelm His. From 1930 to 1933 he was an assistant at the Charité hospital, University of Berlin, where he worked in the radiology department. His daytime job in clinical radiology funded his evening researches in the laboratory, where he developed an interest in carbohydrate metabolism.

In 1933 Adolf Hitler passed the Law for the Restoration of the Professional Civil Service, which applied to non-Aryans. Later a similar law was passed to cover all lawyers, doctors and other professions. Kosterlitz, who had Jewish ancestry, contacted John Macleod, FRS in Aberdeen, who managed to accumulate some modest funding, sufficient for him to reply 'come to Aberdeen ... but no guarantee of a secure job'. Kosterlitz arrived the following March.

Soon after Macleod's untimely death on 16 March 1935, Kosterlitz was awarded the first ever project grant (£50) from the newly founded Diabetic Association. He later received his first grant from the MRC. Between 1936 and 1940 he received funding from The Carnegie Trust for the Universities of Scotland for a Teaching Fellowship to undertake research into the metabolism of the liver. He later received funding of £550 from The Carnegie Trust for travel and maintenance in 1952-53.

On 9 March 1937 he married Johanna Maria Katharina Greßhöner, known as Hanna, a friend from Berlin who had arrived in Scotland in 1935. Both Kosterlitz parents and their younger son Rolf moved to the UK in 1939, and lived at 110b Banbury Road, Oxford. The 1939 National Register shows Bernhard as a medical referee for an insurance company. Hans and Hanna had a son, John Michael, now Professor of Physics at Brown University, who won the Nobel Prize in Physics in 2016.

Over the years Hans Kosterlitz was a Carnegie Teaching Fellow, Lecturer, Senior Lecturer, and finally Reader. In 1968, Aberdeen established a new Department of Pharmacology, which was headed by Kosterlitz as professor until 1973, when he became director of the university's drug addiction research unit.

Kosterlitz is best known for his work as one of the key discoverers of endorphins. He stimulated the mouse isolated vas deferens electrically and recorded its contractions with a polygraph. He then found that if you added opiates to the solution, the muscle would not contract. Opiates inhibited the contraction. Those contractions were later found to resume in the presence of both opiates and an antagonist such as naloxone. Later, endogenous endorphins were discovered by applying pig brain cell homegenate to the apparatus. This caused the contractions to cease. The degree to which an opiate agonist inhibits contractions of the mouse vas deferens, and other tissues like the guinea pig ileum, is highly correlated to its potency as an analgesic.

== Awards, honours and tribute ==
- 1951 Fellow of the Royal Society of Edinburgh
- 1976 Schmiedeberg Plakette, German Pharmacological Society
- 1977 Pacesetter award (US National Institute on Drug Abuse)
- 1977 Scheele Award
- 1978 Fellow of the Royal Society of London
- 1978 Nathan B. Eddy Award
- 1978 Albert Lasker Award for Basic Medical Research
- 1979 Baly Medal, Royal College of Physicians
- 1979 Royal Medal, Royal Society of London
- 1980 MacDougal–Brisbane Prize, Royal Society of Edinburgh
- 1980 Honorary membership, British Pharmacological Society
- 1981 Fellow of the Royal College of Physicians of Edinburgh
- 1981 Feldberg Prize
- 1981 Harvey Prize, Technion – Israel Institute of Technology
- 1982 Sherrington Memorial Medal, Royal Society of Medicine
- 1983 The Dautrebande Prize, Académie Royale de Médecine de Belgique
- 1984 Honorary membership, The Physiological Society
- 1985 Foreign Associate, National Academy of Sciences
- 1987 Wellcome Gold Medal, British Pharmacological Society
- 1988 Cameron Prize for Therapeutics of the University of Edinburgh
- 2010 The Kosterlitz Centre at the University of Aberdeen, opened on 16 September 2010, is named in his honour.

In his 1998 tribute, former colleague and friend Dr Gordon M Lees said of Kosterlitz

"[He] was a quiet, rather modest man, who was greatly respected, both as a scientist and as a person of real courage, honour, judgement, polite manners, and inflexible integrity of conduct and consistency of principle".
