= Hartmut Löwen =

German physicist

Hartmut Löwen (born 23 May 1963, in Hamm) is a German physicist working in the field of statistical mechanics and soft matter physics.

== Career ==
Löwen studied physics, mathematics and chemistry at the Technical University of Dortmund beginning in 1982. He graduated in physics in 1986, and obtained his doctorate in 1987 on phase transitions in Polaron systems with Bernd Gerlach. With Gerlach, he proved the non-existence of phase transitions for many phonon systems and especially polaron systems, in contrast to what was previously expected. He then worked as a postdoctoral researcher at LMU Munich, where he completed his habilitation in 1993 with Herbert Wagner. In 1990/91 he was at the École normale supérieure de Lyon with Jean-Pierre Hansen. Since 1995 he has been a full professor at the Heinrich Heine University Düsseldorf. He has also been visiting professor at the University of Cambridge and the Sapienza University of Rome in Rome.

== Research ==
Löwen's fields of research include statistical physics colloidal suspensions, polymer physics, physics of self-propelled active particles and swimming micro-organisms, physics of biological macromolecules such as proteins and DNA, Glass transition, melting processes and crystal growth, liquid crystals, density functional theory, polaron systems.

In 1994, he received a Heisenberg grant and the Gerhard Hess Prize of the German Research Foundation (DFG). In 2003 he received the Gentner-Kastler-Preis of the German Physical Society.

== Notable publications ==
- Bechinger, Clemens; Di Leonardo, Roberto; Löwen, Hartmut; Reichhardt, Charles; Volpe, Giorgio; Volpe, Giovanni (23 November 2016). "Active Particles in Complex and Crowded Environments". Reviews of Modern Physics. 88 (4) 045006. arXiv:1602.00081. Bibcode:2016RvMP...88d5006B. doi:10.1103/revmodphys.88.045006. ISSN 0034-6861. S2CID 14940249.
- Buttinoni, Ivo; Bialké, Julian; Kümmel, Felix; Löwen, Hartmut; Bechinger, Clemens; Speck, Thomas (5 June 2013). "Dynamical Clustering and Phase Separation in Suspensions of Self-Propelled Colloidal Particles". Physical Review Letters. 110 (23) 238301. arXiv:1305.4185. Bibcode:2013PhRvL.110w8301B. doi:10.1103/physrevlett.110.238301. ISSN 0031-9007. PMID 25167534. S2CID 17127522.
- Wensink, H. H.; Dunkel, J.; Heidenreich, S.; Drescher, K.; Goldstein, R. E.; Lowen, H.; Yeomans, J. M. (20 August 2012). "Meso-scale turbulence in living fluids". Proceedings of the National Academy of Sciences. 109 (36): 14308–14313. arXiv:1208.4239. Bibcode:2012PNAS..10914308W. doi:10.1073/pnas.1202032109. ISSN 0027-8424. PMC 3437854. PMID 22908244.
- Löwen, Hartmut (1994). "Melting, freezing and colloidal suspensions". Physics Reports. 237 (5). Elsevier BV: 249–324. Bibcode:1994PhR...237..249L. doi:10.1016/0370-1573(94)90017-5. ISSN 0370-1573.
- Likos, C. N.; Löwen, H.; Watzlawek, M.; Abbas, B.; Jucknischke, O.; Allgaier, J.; Richter, D. (18 May 1998). "Star Polymers Viewed as Ultrasoft Colloidal Particles". Physical Review Letters. 80 (20). American Physical Society (APS): 4450–4453. Bibcode:1998PhRvL..80.4450L. doi:10.1103/physrevlett.80.4450. ISSN 0031-9007.
