= Jürgen Kurths =

German physicist

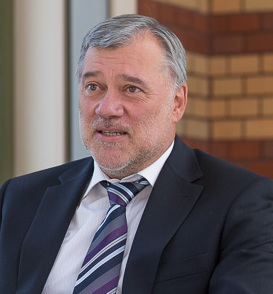
Kurths at the Potsdam Institute for Climate Impact Research

Jürgen Kurths (born 11 March 1953) is a German physicist and mathematician. He is senior advisor in the research department Complexity Sciences of the Potsdam Institute for Climate Impact Research, a professor of nonlinear dynamics at the Institute of Physics at the Humboldt University, Berlin, and a 6th-century chair for complex systems biology at the Institute for Complex Systems and Mathematical Biology at Kings College, Aberdeen University (UK). His research is mainly concerned with nonlinear physics and complex systems sciences and their applications to challenging problems in Earth system, physiology, systems biology and engineering.

== Biography ==
Kurths studied mathematics at the University of Rostock and was awarded his PhD in 1983 at the GDR Academy of Sciences, followed by his installation in 1991 in theoretical physics at the University of Rostock. In 1991, in a special program of the Max-Planck-Society, he was selected as one of a few scientists from East Germany to become a director of a new working group and he has formed an internationally well-known group on nonlinear dynamics. In 1994 he got a full-chair on theoretical physics/nonlinear dynamics at the University of Potsdam. There he was also Dean of the Science Faculty (1996–1999), and established as the founding director the Interdisciplinary Centre for Dynamics of Complex Systems (1994–2008). He was the founding director of the Leibniz-Kolleg Potsdam. In 2008, he was called to re-create the research domain Transdisciplinary Concepts at PIK and to bring complex systems perspectives into Earth system research and has become a Professor of Nonlinear Dynamics at the Institute of Physics at the Humboldt University, Berlin, and in 2009 a 6th-century chair for Complex Systems Biology at the Institute for Complex Systems and Mathematical Biology at Kings College, Aberdeen University. Since 2021, he is senior advisor at the PIK.

== Research impact ==
From time series analysis and its application to solar and stellar activity phenomena, his interest was drawn in the 1980s to complex systems and nonlinearity or chaos theory. Kurths has been noted especially for his seminal contributions to new synchronization phenomena, recurrence, coherence resonance, measures of complexity and causality as well as dynamics and stability of complex networks. This is what later led him to do research on the basics of complex systems theory as well as applications to the Earth system, the human brain, the cardio-respiratory system and other systems which are characterised by a high degree of complexity and nonlinearity.

Kurths maintains a large network of scientific collaborators and he has had more than 60 PhD students from about 20 countries, 30 of whom now have tenured positions in various countries.

He published more 1200 articles (as of October 2022) and eight books. He is currently on the editorial board of more than 10 scientific journals, among them Chaos, Philosophical Transactions of the Royal Society A, PLOS One, European Journal of Physics, J. Nonlinear Science and Nonlinear Processes in Geophysics and of the Springer Series Complexity.

== International scientific activities ==
Kurths has been a leader in many international scientific activities, including the presidency of the EGU Nonlinear Processes in Geosciences Division (2000–2005). His efforts to promote international collaboration led him to organise several large projects in the EU and DFG and to become the speaker of an International Research Training Group on complex networks (DFG and Brazil) since 2011.

== Prizes and awards ==
Jürgen Kurths is an elected fellow of the American Physical Society (1999). He received an Alexander von Humboldt research award from Council of Scientific and Industrial Research (CSIR) (India) in 2005. He has become a member of the Academia Europaea in 2010 and of the Macedonian Academy of Sciences and Arts in 2012 and was bestowed with a Dr. honoris causa from the Lobachevsky University in Nizhny Novgorod in 2008 and one from the Chernishevsky University, Saratov. He is honorary professor at the University of Potsdam and guest professor at the Southeast University in Nanjing. He was awarded the Lewis Fry Richardson Medal of the European Geosciences Union in 2013.

== Kurths's seminal papers (selection) ==
- Kurths, J.; Voss, A.; Saparin, P.; Witt, A.; Kleiner, H. J.; Wessel, N. (1995). "Quantitative analysis of heart rate variability". Chaos: An Interdisciplinary Journal of Nonlinear Science. 5 (1). AIP Publishing: 88–94. Bibcode:1995Chaos...5...88K. doi:10.1063/1.166090. ISSN 1054-1500. PMID 12780160.
- Rosenblum, Michael G.; Pikovsky, Arkady S.; Kurths, Jürgen (11 March 1996). "Phase Synchronization of Chaotic Oscillators". Physical Review Letters. 76 (11). American Physical Society (APS): 1804–1807. Bibcode:1996PhRvL..76.1804R. doi:10.1103/physrevlett.76.1804. ISSN 0031-9007. PMID 10060525.
- Pikovsky, Arkady S.; Kurths, Jürgen (3 February 1997). "Coherence Resonance in a Noise-Driven Excitable System". Physical Review Letters. 78 (5). American Physical Society (APS): 775–778. Bibcode:1997PhRvL..78..775P. doi:10.1103/physrevlett.78.775. ISSN 0031-9007. S2CID 933182.
- Schäfer, Carsten; Rosenblum, Michael G.; Kurths, Jürgen; Abel, Hans-Henning (1998). "Heartbeat synchronized with ventilation". Nature. 392 (6673). Springer Science and Business Media LLC: 239–240. Bibcode:1998Natur.392..239S. doi:10.1038/32567. ISSN 0028-0836. PMID 9521318. S2CID 4383936.
- Pikovsky, Arkady; Rosenblum, M.; Kuths, J. (2001). Synchronization: a universal concept in nonlinear sciences. Cambridge: Cambridge University Press. ISBN 978-0-521-53352-2. OCLC 45804833.
- Boccaletti, S.; Kurths, J.; Osipov, G.; Valladares, D.L.; Zhou, C.S. (2002). "The synchronization of chaotic systems". Physics Reports. 366 (1–2). Elsevier BV: 1–101. Bibcode:2002PhR...366....1B. doi:10.1016/s0370-1573(02)00137-0. ISSN 0370-1573.
- Marwan, Norbert; Wessel, Niels; Meyerfeldt, Udo; Schirdewan, Alexander; Kurths, Jürgen (6 August 2002). "Recurrence Plot Based Measures of Complexity and its Application to Heart Rate Variability Data". Physical Review E. 66 (2) 026702. arXiv:physics/0201064. Bibcode:2002PhRvE..66b6702M. doi:10.1103/PhysRevE.66.026702. ISSN 2470-0045. PMID 12241313.
- Zhou, Changsong; Motter, Adilson E.; Kurths, Jürgen (23 January 2006). "Universality in the Synchronization of Weighted Random Networks". Physical Review Letters. 96 (3) 034101. arXiv:cond-mat/0604070. Bibcode:2006PhRvL..96c4101Z. doi:10.1103/physrevlett.96.034101. ISSN 0031-9007. PMID 16486704. S2CID 10872040.
- Marwan, N.; Romano, M.C.; Thiel, M.; Kurths, J. (2007). "Recurrence plots for the analysis of complex systems". Physics Reports. 438 (5–6). Elsevier BV: 237–329. arXiv:2501.13933. Bibcode:2007PhR...438..237M. doi:10.1016/j.physrep.2006.11.001. ISSN 0370-1573.
- Van Leeuwen, P.; Geue, D.; Thiel, M.; Cysarz, D.; Lange, S.; Romano, M. C.; Wessel, N.; Kurths, J.; Gronemeyer, D. H. (13 July 2009). "Influence of paced maternal breathing on fetal-maternal heart rate coordination". Proceedings of the National Academy of Sciences. 106 (33): 13661–13666. doi:10.1073/pnas.0901049106. ISSN 0027-8424. PMC 2728950. PMID 19597150.
- Marwan, Norbert; Donges, Jonathan; Zou, Yong; Donner, Reik; Kurths, Jürgen (9 November 2009). "Complex network approach for recurrence analysis of time series". Physics Letters A. 373 (46): 4246–4254. arXiv:0907.3368. Bibcode:2009PhLA..373.4246M. doi:10.1016/j.physleta.2009.09.042.
- Donges, J. F.; Zou, Y.; Marwan, N.; Kurths, J. (1 August 2009). "The backbone of the climate network". EPL (Europhysics Letters). 87 (4) 48007. arXiv:1002.2100. Bibcode:2009EL.....8748007D. doi:10.1209/0295-5075/87/48007. ISSN 0295-5075. S2CID 11225385.
- Wu, Y.; Zhou, C.; Xiao, J.; Kurths, J.; Schellnhuber, H. J. (19 October 2010). "Evidence for a bimodal distribution in human communication". Proceedings of the National Academy of Sciences. 107 (44): 18803–18808. Bibcode:2010PNAS..10718803W. doi:10.1073/pnas.1013140107. ISSN 0027-8424. PMC 2973857. PMID 20959414.
- Menck, P.J.; Heitzig, J.; Marwan, N.; Kurths, J. (6 January 2013). "How basin stability complements the linear-stability paradigm". Nature Physics. 9 (2). Springer Science and Business Media LLC: 89–92. Bibcode:2013NatPh...9...89M. doi:10.1038/nphys2516. ISSN 1745-2473.
- Zou, Y.; Donner, R.V.; Marwan, N.; Donges, J.F.; Kurths, Jürgen (21 January 2019). "Complex network approaches to nonlinear time series analysis". Physics Reports. 787. Elsevier BV: 1–97. arXiv:2501.18737. Bibcode:2019PhR...787....1Z. doi:10.1016/j.physrep.2018.10.005. ISSN 0370-1573. S2CID 126400586.
