= Werthamer–Helfand–Hohenberg theory =

In physics, The Werthamer–Helfand–Hohenberg (WHH) theory was proposed in 1966 by N. Richard Werthamer, Eugene Helfand and Pierre Hohenberg to go beyond BCS theory of superconductivity and it provides predictions of upper critical field (H_{c2}) in type-II superconductors. The theory predicts the upper critical field (H_{c2}) at 0 K from T_{c} and the slope of H_{c2} at T_{c}.
