= Bertrand Halperin =

American mathematician and physicist (born 1941)

Bert Halperin
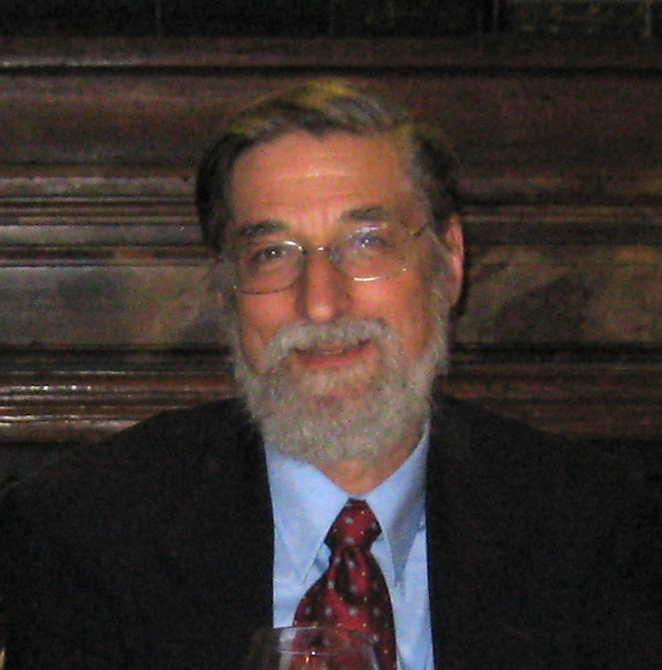
- Born: December 6, 1941 (age 84); Brooklyn, New York City, U.S.
- Education: Harvard University (BA); University of California, Berkeley (PhD)
- Known for: Hexatic phase Quantum Hall effect KTHNY theory
- Awards: Oliver E. Buckley Condensed Matter Prize (1982); Lars Onsager Prize (2001); Wolf Prize in Physics (2003); APS Medal (2019)
- Scientific career
- Fields: Physics
- Workplaces: Harvard University
- Doctoral advisor: John J. Hopfield
- Doctoral students: Catherine Kallin Steven H. Simon

Bertrand I. Halperin (born December 6, 1941) is an American physicist, former holder of the Hollis Chair of Mathematicks and Natural Philosophy at the physics department of Harvard University. In 2006, he received the Wolf Prize in Physics for his various contribution to condensed matter physics, including work on KTHNY theory for two-dimensional melting.

== Biography ==
Bertrand Halperin was born in Brooklyn, New York, where he grew up in the Crown Heights neighborhood and attended public schools. His mother was Eva Teplitzky Halperin and his father Morris Halperin. His mother was a college administrator and his father a customs inspector. Both his parents were born in USSR. His paternal grandmother's family the Maximovs claimed descent from Rabbi Israel Baal Shem Tov (BeShT).

He attended Harvard University (class of 1961), and did his graduate work at the University of California, Berkeley, with John J. Hopfield (PhD 1965).

== Scientific career ==
After working at Bell Laboratories for 10 years (1966–1976), Murray Hill, New Jersey he was appointed professor of physics at Harvard University.

In the 1970s, he, together with David Robert Nelson, worked out a theory of two-dimensional melting, predicting the hexatic phase before it was experimentally observed by Pindak et al. In the 1980s, he made contributions to the theory of the quantum Hall effect and of the fractional quantum Hall effect. His recent interests lie in the area of strongly interacting low-dimensional electron systems.

== Awards and recognition ==
Halperin was elected a Fellow of the American Physical Society in 1972, a member of the American Academy of Arts and Sciences in 1981, a member of the National Academy of Sciences in 1982, and a member of the American Philosophical Society in 1990. In 2001, he was awarded the Lars Onsager Prize. In 2003, he was awarded the Wolf Prize in physics for his work on "two- dimensional melting, disordered systems and strongly interacting electrons", the other half went to Anthony James Leggett. In 2016 he was Lise Meitner Distinguished Lecturer.

In 2018, he was awarded the 2019 APS Medal for Exceptional Achievement in Research, for "his seminal contributions to theoretical condensed matter physics, especially his pioneering work on the role of topology in both classical and quantum systems."

== Published works ==
- Halperin, Bertrand I.; Anderson, Philip W.; Varma, Chandra M. (January 1972). "Anomalous low-temperature thermal properties of glasses and spin glasses". Philosophical Magazine. 25 (1): 1–9. Bibcode:1972PMag...25....1A. doi:10.1080/14786437208229210. Pdf.

== See also ==
- Dynamic scaling

Academic offices
Preceded by Andrew Gleason	Hollis Chair of Mathematics and Natural Philosophy; 1992–present	Succeeded by current incumbent
