= Berezinskii–Kosterlitz–Thouless transition =

Phase transition in the two-dimensional (2-D) XY model

The Berezinskii–Kosterlitz–Thouless (BKT) transition is a phase transition of the two-dimensional (2-D) XY model in statistical physics. It is a transition from bound vortex-antivortex pairs at low temperatures to unpaired vortices and anti-vortices at some critical temperature. The transition is named for condensed matter physicists Vadim Berezinskii, John M. Kosterlitz and David J. Thouless. BKT transitions can be found in several 2-D systems in condensed matter physics that are approximated by the XY model, including Josephson junction arrays and thin disordered superconducting granular films. More recently, the term has been applied by the 2-D superconductor insulator transition community to the pinning of Cooper pairs in the insulating regime, due to similarities with the original vortex BKT transition.

The critical density of the BKT transition in the weakly interacting system reads

$$n_\text{c} = \frac{mT}{2 \pi} \ln \frac{\xi}{mU}$$

where the dimensionless constant was found to be $\xi = 380 \pm 3$.

Work on the transition led to the 2016 Nobel Prize in Physics being awarded to Thouless and Kosterlitz; Berezinskii died in 1981.

== XY model ==
The XY model is a two-dimensional vector spin model that possesses U(1) (i.e. circular) symmetry. This system does not possess a normal second-order phase transition. This is because the expected ordered phase of the system is destroyed by transverse fluctuations, known as the Nambu-Goldstone modes associated with this broken continuous symmetry; these fluctuations logarithmically diverge with system size. This is a specific case of the Mermin–Wagner theorem in spin systems.

The transition is not rigorously understood, but the existence of two phases was proved by McBryan & Spencer (1977) and Fröhlich & Spencer (1981).

=== Disordered phases with different correlations ===
In the XY model in two dimensions, a second-order phase transition is not seen. However, one finds a low-temperature quasi-ordered phase with a correlation function that decreases with the distance like a power, which depends on the temperature. The transition from the high-temperature disordered phase with the exponential correlation to this low-temperature quasi-ordered phase is a Kosterlitz–Thouless transition. It is a phase transition of infinite order.

=== Role of vortices ===
In the 2-D XY model, vortices are topologically stable configurations. It is found that the high-temperature disordered phase with exponential correlation decay is a result of the formation of vortices. Vortex generation becomes thermodynamically favorable at the critical temperature $T_\text{c}$ of the Kosterlitz–Thouless transition. At temperatures below this, vortex generation has a power law correlation.

The Kosterlitz–Thouless transition is caused by a dissociation of bound vortex-antivortex pairs, where the vortex and antivortex have opposite circulations. This process was first described by Vadim Berezinskii. In these systems, thermal generation of vortices produces an even number of vortices of opposite sign. Bound vortex–antivortex pairs have lower energies than free vortices, but have lower entropy as well. In order to minimize free energy, $F=E-TS$, the system undergoes a transition at a critical temperature, $T_\text{c}$. Below $T_\text{c}$, there are only bound vortex–antivortex pairs; above $T_\text{c}$, there are free vortices.

== Informal description ==
There is an elegant thermodynamic argument for the Kosterlitz–Thouless transition. The energy of a single vortex is $\kappa\ln(R/a)$, where $\kappa$ is a parameter that depends upon the system in which the vortex is located, $R$ is the system size, and $a$ is the radius of the vortex core. One assumes $R\gg a$. In the 2D system, the number of possible positions of a vortex is approximately $(R/a)^2$. From Boltzmann's entropy formula, $S= k_{\rm B} \ln W$ (with W is the number of states), the entropy is $S=2k_{\rm B}\ln(R/a)$, where $k_{\rm B}$ is the Boltzmann constant. Thus, the Helmholtz free energy is

$$F = E - TS = (\kappa - 2k_{\rm B}T)\ln(R/a).$$

When $F>0$, the system will not have a vortex. On the other hand, when $F<0$, entropic considerations favor the formation of a vortex. The critical temperature above which vortices may form can be found by setting $F=0$ and is given by

$$T_\text{c} = \frac{\kappa}{2k_{\rm B}}.$$

The Kosterlitz–Thouless transition can be observed experimentally in systems like 2D Josephson junction arrays by taking current and voltage (I-V) measurements. Above $T_\text{c}$, the relation will be linear $V \sim I$. Just below $T_c$, the relation will be $V \sim I^3$, as the number of free vortices will go as $I^2$. This jump from linear dependence is indicative of a Kosterlitz–Thouless transition and may be used to determine $T_\text{c}$. This approach was used in Resnick et al. to confirm the Kosterlitz–Thouless transition in proximity-coupled Josephson junction arrays.

== Field theoretic analysis ==
The following discussion uses field theoretic methods. Assume a field φ(x) defined in the plane which takes on values in $S^1$, so that $\phi(x)$ is identified with $\phi(x) + 2\pi$. That is, the circle is realized as $S^1 = \mathbb{R}/2\pi\mathbb{Z}$.

The energy is given by

$$E = \int \frac{1}{2} \nabla\phi\cdot\nabla\phi \, d^2 x$$

and the Boltzmann factor is $\exp (-\beta E)$.

Taking a contour integral $\textstyle \oint_\gamma d\phi = \oint_\gamma \frac{d\phi}{dx}dx$ over any contractible closed path $\gamma$, we would expect it to be zero (for example, by the fundamental theorem of calculus). However, this is not the case due to the singular nature of vortices (which give singularities in $\phi$).

To render the theory well-defined, it is only defined up to some energetic cut-off scale $\Lambda$, so that we can puncture the plane at the points where the vortices are located, by removing regions with size of order $1/\Lambda$. If $\gamma$ winds counter-clockwise once around a puncture, the contour integral $\textstyle \oint_\gamma d\phi$ is an integer multiple of $2\pi$. The value of this integer is the index of the vector field $\nabla \phi$.

Suppose that a given field configuration has $N$ punctures located at $x_i, i=1,\dots,N$ each with index $n_i=\pm 1$. Then, $\phi$ decomposes into the sum of a field configuration with no punctures, $\phi_0$ and $\textstyle \sum_{i=1}^N n_i\arg(z-z_i)$, where we have switched to the complex plane coordinates for convenience. The complex argument function has a branch cut, but, because $\phi$ is defined modulo $2\pi$, it has no physical consequences.

Now,

$$E = \int \frac{1}{2} \nabla\phi_0\cdot\nabla\phi_0 \, d^2 x + \sum_{1\leq i < j \leq N} n_i n_j \int \frac{1}{2} \nabla \ \arg(z-z_i)\cdot\nabla \arg(z-z_j) \, d^2 x$$

If $\textstyle \sum_{i=1}^N n_i \neq 0$, the second term is positive and diverges in the limit $\Lambda \to \infty$: configurations with unbalanced numbers of vortices of each orientation are never energetically favoured.

However, if the neutral condition $\textstyle \sum_{i=1}^N n_i=0$ holds, the second term is equal to $\textstyle -2\pi \sum_{1\leq i < j \leq N} n_i n_j \ln(|x_j-x_i|/L)$, which is the total potential energy of a two-dimensional Coulomb gas. The scale L is an arbitrary scale that renders the argument of the logarithm dimensionless.

Assume the case with only vortices of multiplicity $\pm 1$. At low temperatures and large $\beta$ the distance between a vortex and antivortex pair tends to be extremely small, essentially of the order $1/\Lambda$. At large temperatures and small $\beta$ this distance increases, and the favoured configuration becomes effectively the one of a gas of free vortices and antivortices. The transition between the two different configurations is the Kosterlitz–Thouless phase transition, and the transition point is associated with an unbinding of vortex-antivortex pairs.

== See also ==
- KTHNY theory
- Goldstone boson
- Composite fermion
- Lambda transition
- Ising model
- Potts model
- Topological defect
- Quantum vortex
- Superfluid film
- Hexatic phase

== Books ==
- J.V. Jose, 40 Years of Berezinskii–Kosterlitz–Thouless Theory, World Scientific, 2013, ISBN 978-981-4417-65-5
- H. Kleinert, Gauge Fields in Condensed Matter, Vol. I, " SUPERFLOW AND VORTEX LINES", pp. 1–742, World Scientific (Singapore, 1989); Paperback ISBN 9971-5-0210-0 (also available online: Vol. I. Read pp. 618–688);
- H. Kleinert, Multivalued Fields in Condensed Matter, Electrodynamics, and Gravitation, World Scientific (Singapore, 2008) (also available online: here)
