= Duncan Haldane =

British physicist

Professor Duncan Haldane FRS FInstP
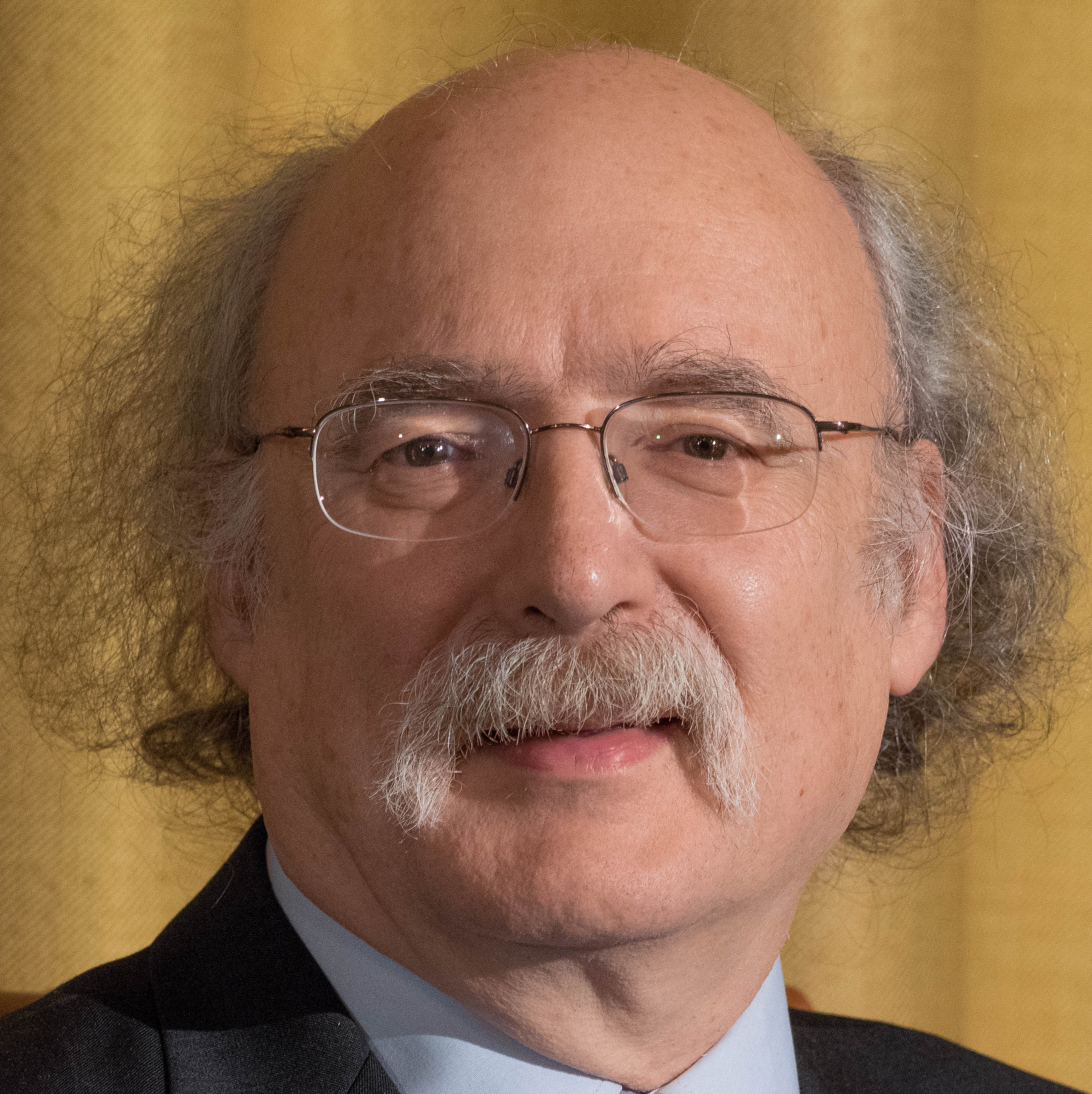
- Haldane in 2016
- Born: Frederick Duncan Michael Haldane; 14 September 1951 (age 75); London, England
- Citizenship: United Kingdom; Slovenia
- Education: St Paul's School, London; University of Cambridge (BA, PhD)
- Known for: Haldane pseudopotentials in the fractional quantum Hall effect Quantum anomalous Hall effect
- Awards: Oliver E. Buckley Condensed Matter Prize (1993); Dirac Medal (2012); Nobel Prize in Physics (2016); Foreign Associate of the National Academy of Sciences (2017)
- Scientific career
- Fields: Condensed matter theory
- Workplaces: Princeton University; University of California, San Diego; University of Southern California; Bell Laboratories
- Thesis: An extension of the Anderson model as a model for mixed valence rare earth materials (1978)
- Doctoral advisor: Philip Warren Anderson
- Doctoral students: Ashvin Vishwanath
- Website: physics.princeton.edu/~haldane/

Frederick Duncan Michael Haldane (born 14 September 1951) is a British physicist who is currently the Sherman Fairchild University Professor of Physics at Princeton University. He is a co-recipient of the 2016 Nobel Prize in Physics, along with David J. Thouless and J. Michael Kosterlitz.

== Education ==
Haldane was educated at St Paul's School, London and Christ's College, Cambridge, where he was awarded a Bachelor of Arts degree followed by a PhD in 1978 for research supervised by Philip Warren Anderson.

== Career and research ==
Haldane worked as a physicist at Institut Laue–Langevin in France between 1977 and 1981. In August 1981, Haldane became an assistant professor of physics at the University of Southern California, where he remained until 1987. Haldane was then appointed as an associate professor of physics in 1981 and later a professor of physics in 1986. In July 1986, Haldane joined the department of physics at the University of California, San Diego as a professor of physics, where he remained until February 1992. In 1990, Haldane was appointed as a professor of physics in the department of physics at Princeton University, where he remains to this day. In 1999, Haldane was named as the Eugene Higgins Professor of Physics. In 2017, he was named the Sherman Fairchild University Professor of Physics. From 2013 to 2018, Haldane also held a Distinguished Visiting Research Chair at the Perimeter Institute for Theoretical Physics.

Haldane is known for a wide variety of fundamental contributions to condensed matter physics including the theory of Luttinger liquids, the theory of one-dimensional spin chains, the theory of fractional quantum hall effect, exclusion statistics, entanglement spectra, and much more.

As of 2011, he was developing a new geometric description of the fractional quantum Hall effect that introduces the "shape" of the "composite boson", described by a "unimodular" (determinant 1) spatial metric-tensor field as the fundamental collective degree of freedom of fractional quantum Hall effect (FQHE) states. This new "Chern-Simons + quantum geometry" description is a replacement for the "Chern-Simons + Ginzburg-Landau" paradigm introduced around 1990. Unlike its predecessor, it provides a description of the FQHE collective mode that agrees with the Girvin-Macdonald-Platzman "single-mode approximation".

== Awards and honours ==
Haldane was elected a Fellow of the Royal Society (FRS) in 1996 and a Fellow of the American Academy of Arts and Sciences (Boston) in 1992; a Fellow of the American Physical Society (1986) and a Fellow of the Institute of Physics (1996) (UK); a Fellow of the American Association for the Advancement of Science (2001). Haldane was elected as a member of the U.S. National Academy of Sciences in 2017. He was awarded the Oliver E. Buckley Prize of the American Physical Society (1993); Alfred P. Sloan Foundation Research Fellow (1984–88); Lorentz Chair (2008), Dirac Medal (2012); Doctor Honoris Causae of the University of Ljubljana, Slovenia; Université de Cergy-Pontoise (2015); Lise Meitner Distinguished Lecturer (2017); Golden Plate Award of the American Academy of Achievement (2017).

With David J. Thouless and J. Michael Kosterlitz, Haldane shared the 2016 Nobel Prize in Physics "for theoretical discoveries of topological phase transitions and topological phases of matter".

== Personal life ==
Haldane is a British and Slovenian citizen and United States permanent resident. Haldane and his wife, Odile Belmont, live in Princeton, New Jersey. His father was a doctor in the British Army stationed on the Yugoslavia/Austria border, and there he met young medicine student Ljudmila Renko, a Slovene, and subsequently married her and moved back to England where Duncan was born.

He received Slovenian citizenship at a ceremony at the Slovenian Embassy in Washington, DC on March 22, 2019.

== See also ==
- Haldane–Shastry model
- Fractional quantum Hall effect
- Quantum spin Hall effect
- Photonic topological insulator
- Spin–charge separation
