= David Thouless =

British physicist (1934–2019)

Professor David Thouless FRS
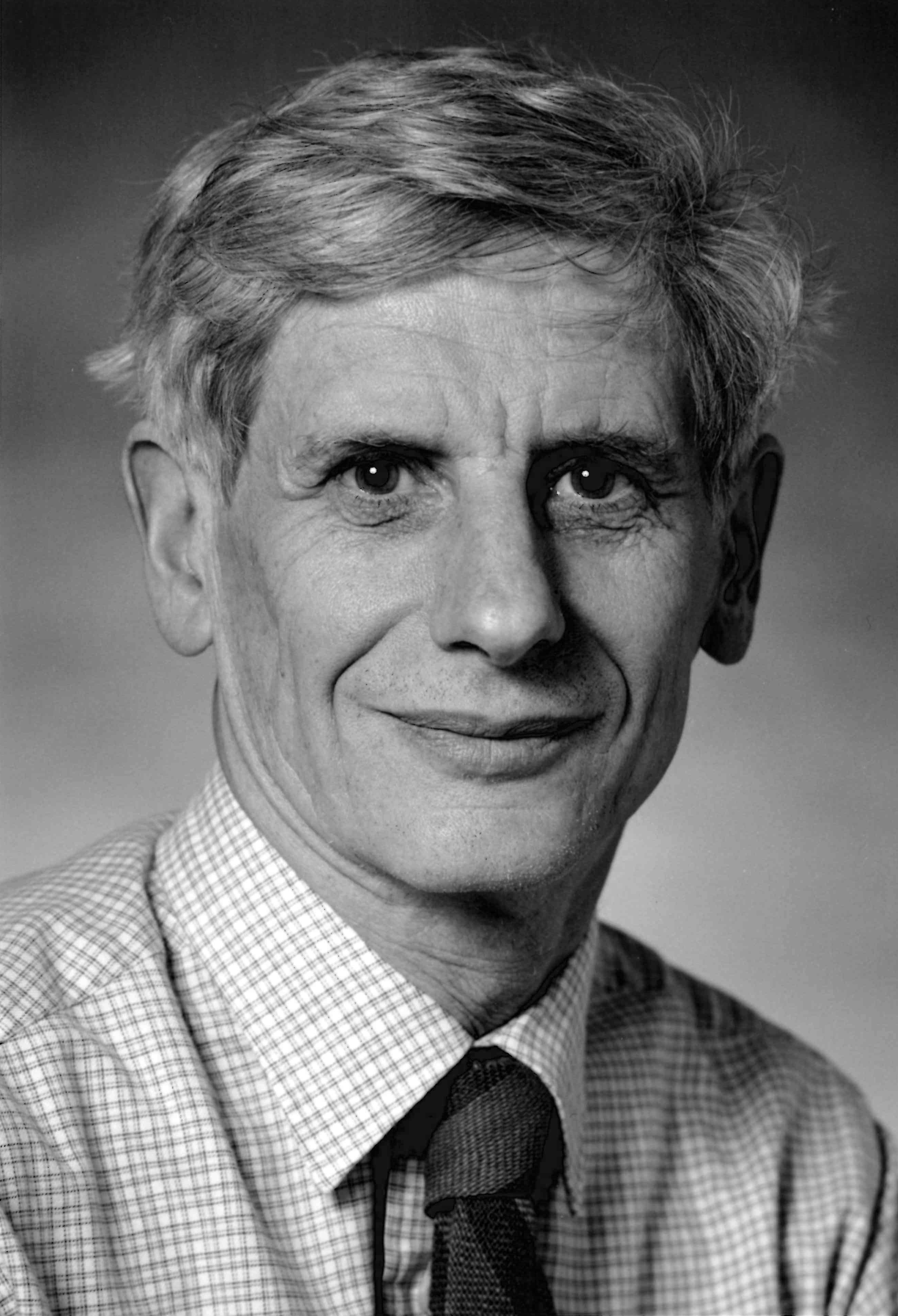
- David Thouless in 1995
- Born: David James Thouless; 21 September 1934; Bearsden, Scotland
- Died: 6 April 2019 (aged 84); Cambridge, England
- Citizenship: United Kingdom
- Education: Winchester College; University of Cambridge (BA); Cornell University (PhD)
- Known for: Berezinskii–Kosterlitz–Thouless transition; Thouless energy; KTHNY theory; Topological quantum numbers
- Spouse: Margaret Elizabeth Scrase (m. 1958)
- Children: 3
- Awards: Maxwell Medal and Prize (1973); Fellow of the Royal Society (1979); Holweck Prize (1980); Fritz London Memorial Prize (1984); Wolf Prize (1990); Member of the National Academy of Sciences (1995); Lars Onsager Prize (2000); Nobel Prize in Physics (2016)
- Scientific career
- Fields: Condensed matter physics
- Workplaces: University of Washington; University of California, Berkeley; University of Birmingham; Yale University
- Thesis: The application of perturbation methods to the theory of nuclear matter (1958)
- Doctoral advisor: Hans Bethe
- Notable students: J. Michael Kosterlitz (postdoc)

David James Thouless (/ˈθaʊlɛs/; 21 September 1934 – 6 April 2019) was a British condensed-matter physicist. He was awarded the 1990 Wolf Prize and a laureate of the 2016 Nobel Prize for physics along with F. Duncan M. Haldane and J. Michael Kosterlitz for theoretical discoveries of topological phase transitions and topological phases of matter.

== Education ==
Born on 21 September 1934 in Bearsden, Scotland, to English parents, Priscilla (Gorton) Thouless, an English teacher, and Robert Thouless a psychologist and broadcaster. David Thouless was educated at St Faith's School then Winchester College and earned a Bachelor of Arts degree in Natural Sciences from the University of Cambridge as an undergraduate student of Trinity Hall, Cambridge. He obtained his PhD at Cornell University, where Hans Bethe was his doctoral advisor.

== Career and research ==
Thouless was a postdoctoral researcher at Lawrence Berkeley Laboratory, University of California, Berkeley, and also worked in the physics department from 1958 to 1959, giving a course on atomic physics. He was the first director of studies in physics at Churchill College, Cambridge, in 1961–1965, professor of mathematical physics at the University of Birmingham in the United Kingdom in 1965–1978, and professor of applied science at Yale University from 1979 to 1980, before becoming a professor of physics at the University of Washington in Seattle in 1980. Thouless made many theoretical contributions to the understanding of extended systems of atoms and electrons, and of nucleons. He also worked on superconductivity phenomena, properties of nuclear matter, and excited collective motions within nuclei.

Thouless made many important contributions to the theory of many-body problems. For atomic nuclei, he cleared up the concept of 'rearrangement energy' and derived an expression for the moment of inertia of deformed nuclei. In statistical mechanics, he contributed many ideas to the understanding of ordering, including the concept of 'topological ordering'. Other important results relate to localised electron states in disordered lattices.

=== Academic papers ===
Selected papers include:

- Kosterlitz, J. M.; Thouless, D. J. (1973). "Ordering, metastability and phase transitions in two-dimensional systems" (PDF). Journal of Physics C: Solid State Physics. 6 (7): 1181–1203. Bibcode:1973JPhC....6.1181K. doi:10.1088/0022-3719/6/7/010. ISSN 0022-3719.
- Thouless, D. J.; Kohmoto, M.; Nightingale, M. P.; den Nijs, M. (1982). "Quantized Hall Conductance in a Two-Dimensional Periodic Potential". Physical Review Letters. 49 (6): 405–408. Bibcode:1982PhRvL..49..405T. doi:10.1103/PhysRevLett.49.405. ISSN 0031-9007.

=== Books ===
- Thouless, D. J. (1998). Topological Quantum Numbers in Nonrelativistic Physics. Singapore: World Scientific. ISBN 981-02-2900-3. LCCN 98009819. OCLC 38431218.
- Thouless, D. J. (1961). The Quantum Mechanics of Many-Body Systems (1st ed.). New York: Academic Press. ISBN 9780486493572. LCCN 61012282. OCLC 901492152.

=== Awards and honours ===
Thouless was elected a Fellow of the Royal Society (FRS) in 1979, a Fellow of the American Physical Society (1986), a Fellow of the American Academy of Arts and Sciences, and a member of the US National Academy of Sciences (1995). Among his awards are the Wolf Prize for Physics (1990), the Paul Dirac Medal of the Institute of Physics (1993), the Lars Onsager Prize of the American Physical Society (2000), and the Nobel Prize in Physics (2016).

== Personal life ==
Thouless married Margaret Elizabeth Scrase in 1958 and together they had three children. In 2016, Thouless was reported to be suffering from dementia. He died on 6 April 2019 in Cambridge, aged 84. His family donated his Nobel Prize medal to Trinity Hall, Cambridge.

== See also ==
- Hofstadter's butterfly
- Single-electron transistor
