= J. Michael Kosterlitz =

British physicist

Michael Kosterlitz
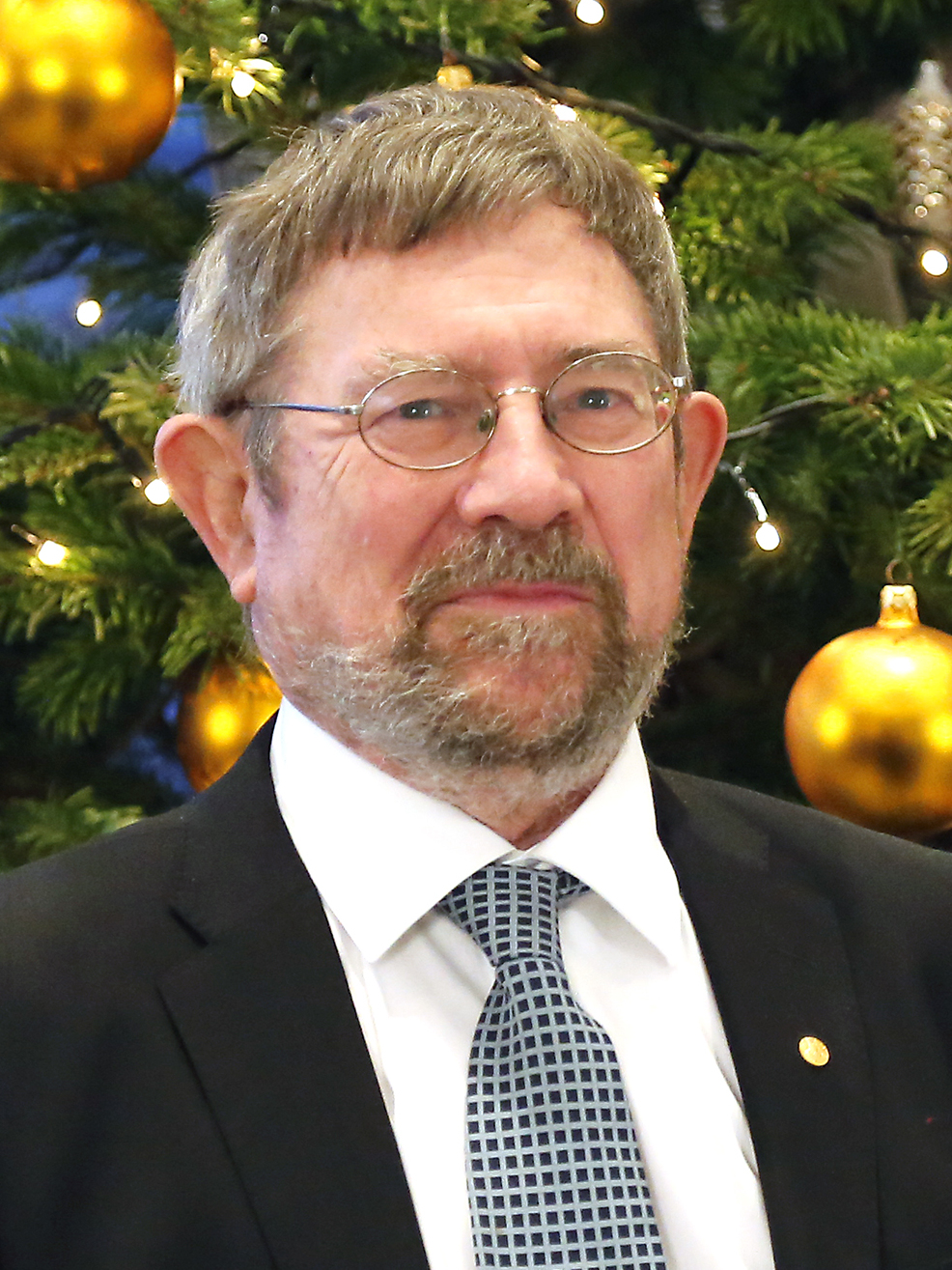
- Kosterlitz in 2016
- Born: John Michael Kosterlitz; June 22, 1943 (age 83); Aberdeen, Scotland, United Kingdom
- Citizenship: United States
- Education: University of Cambridge (MA); University of Oxford (DPhil)
- Known for: Berezinskii–Kosterlitz–Thouless transition KTHNY theory
- Awards: Nobel Prize in Physics (2016); Lars Onsager Prize (2000)
- Scientific career
- Fields: Condensed matter physics
- Workplaces: Brown University; University of Birmingham; Cornell University
- Thesis: Problems in strong interaction physics (1969)
- Academic advisors: David Thouless (postdoc)
- Website: vivo.brown.edu/display/jkosterl

John Michael Kosterlitz (born June 22, 1943) is a British-American physicist. He is a professor of physics at Brown University and the son of biochemist Hans Kosterlitz. He was awarded the 2016 Nobel Prize in physics along with David Thouless and Duncan Haldane for work on condensed matter physics.

== Education and early life ==
He was born in Aberdeen, Scotland, to German-Jewish émigrés, the son of the pioneering biochemist Hans Walter Kosterlitz and Hannah Gresshöner. He was educated independently at Robert Gordon's College before transferring to the Edinburgh Academy to prepare for his university entrance examinations. He received his BA degree, subsequently converted to an MA degree, at Gonville and Caius College, Cambridge. In 1969, he earned a DPhil degree from the University of Oxford as a postgraduate student of Brasenose College, Oxford.

== Career and research ==
After a few postdoctoral positions, including positions at the University of Birmingham, collaborating with David Thouless, and at Cornell University, he was appointed to the faculty of the University of Birmingham in 1974, first as a lecturer and, later, as a reader. Since 1982, he has been professor of physics at Brown University. Kosterlitz was a visiting research fellow at Aalto University in Finland and since 2016 a distinguished professor at Korea Institute for Advanced Study.

Kosterlitz does research in condensed matter theory, one- and two-dimensional physics; in phase transitions: random systems, electron localization, and spin glasses; and in critical dynamics: melting and freezing.

=== Awards and honours ===
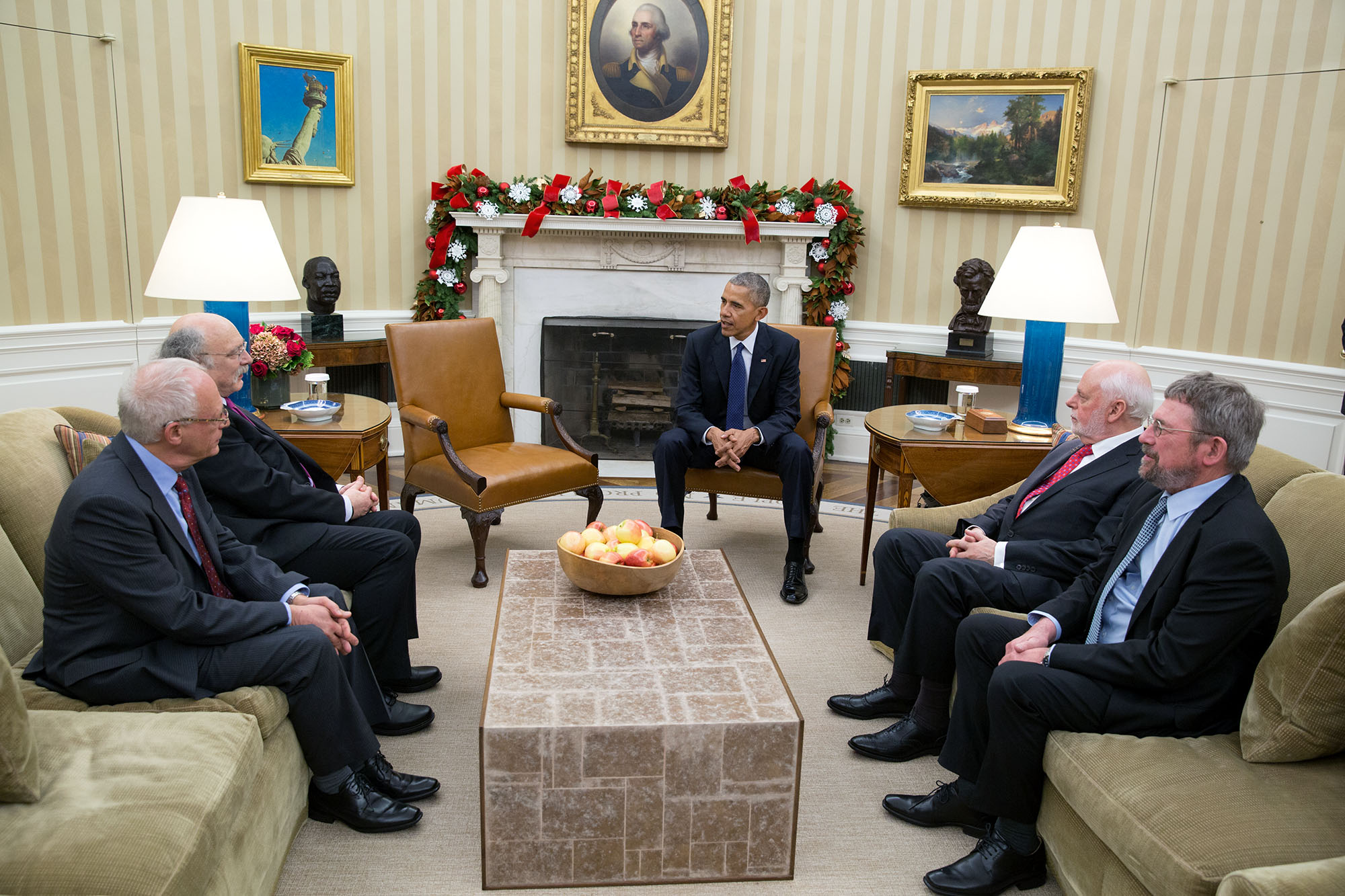
Kosterlitz (right) and fellow 2016 Nobel Prize winners speak with President Barack Obama at the White House

Michael Kosterlitz was awarded the Nobel Prize in Physics in 2016, “for theoretical discoveries of topological phase transitions and topological phases of matter”; the Maxwell Medal and Prize from the British Institute of Physics in 1981, and the Lars Onsager Prize from the American Physical Society in 2000, especially, for his work on the Berezinskii–Kosterlitz–Thouless transition. Since 1992, he has been a Fellow of the American Physical Society. He was elected a Fellow of the Royal Society in 2026.

The Kosterlitz Centre at the University of Aberdeen is named in honour of his father, Hans Kosterlitz, a pioneering biochemist specializing in endorphins, who joined the faculty after fleeing Nazi persecution of Jews in 1934.

== Climbing ==
Kosterlitz was a pioneer in Alpine climbing in the 1960s, known for working routes in the UK, Italian Alps, and Yosemite. His notable ascents include the first ascent of Fessura Kosterlitz (graded f6B/6a+) in the Orco Valley of the Italian Alps, which was subsequently named after him, and the first repeat of American Direct (graded ED1 6c+) on the West Face of the Petit Dru in the Mont Blanc Massif. Kosterlitz is credited with initiating the Nuovo Mattino ("New Morning") movement of alpinism in the 1970s, where free, aid-less ascents made using new technologies (such as camming devices) became favoured.

== Personal life ==
Kosterlitz is an American citizen and is an atheist. He was diagnosed with multiple sclerosis in 1978.

== See also ==
- List of Jewish Nobel laureates
