= Israel Academy of Sciences and Humanities =

National academic institute in Jerusalem

Coordinates: 31°46′13.73″N 35°12′56.74″E

- האקדמיה הלאומית הישראלית למדעים
- Seal of the Israel Academy of Sciences and Humanities
- Formation: 1961
- Headquarters: Talbiya; Jerusalem, Israel
- Members: 160 (May 2026)
- President: David Harel
- Website: academy.ac.il

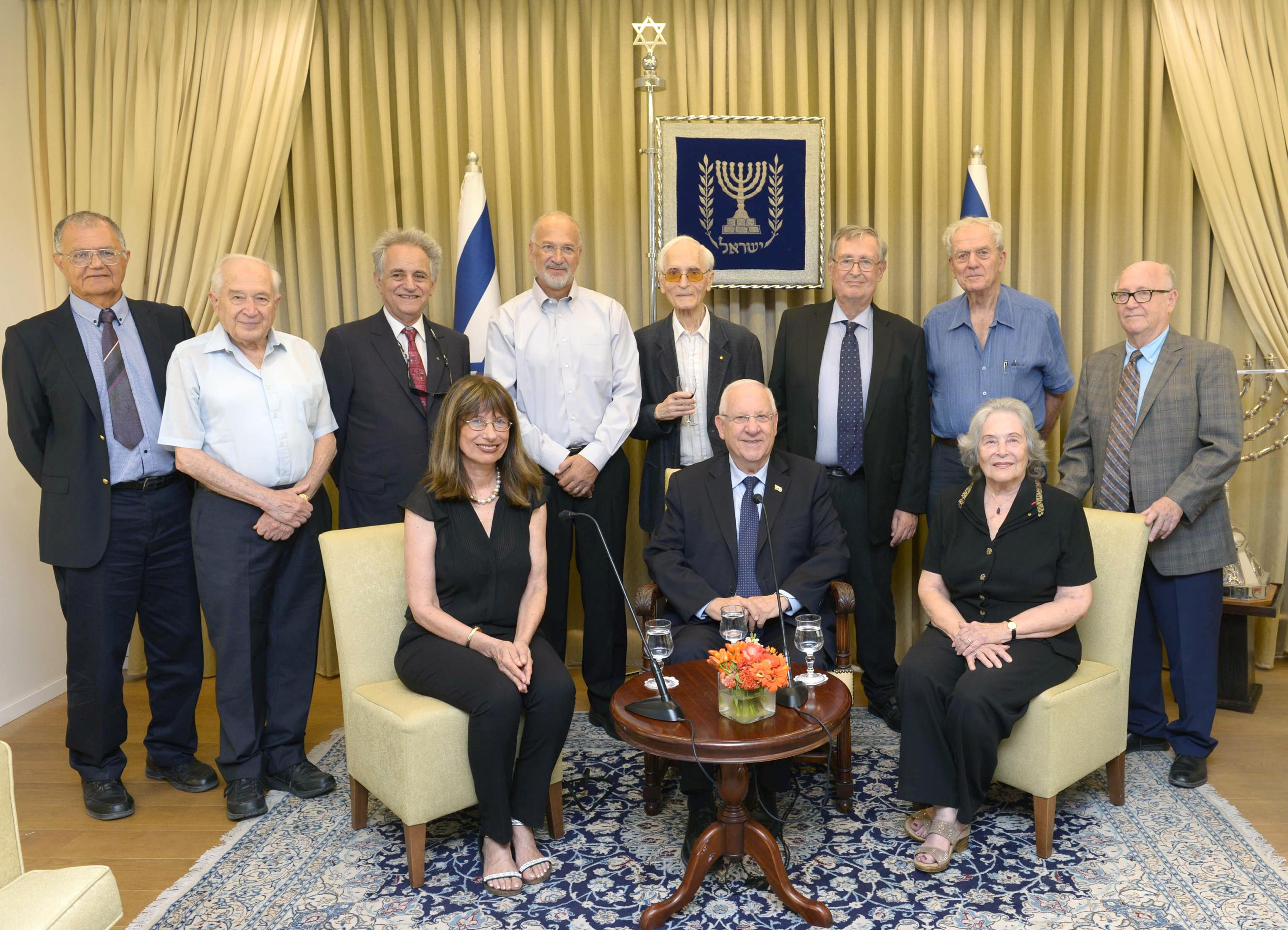
Israeli President Reuven Rivlin with the current and the former presidents of the Israel Academy of Sciences and Humanities

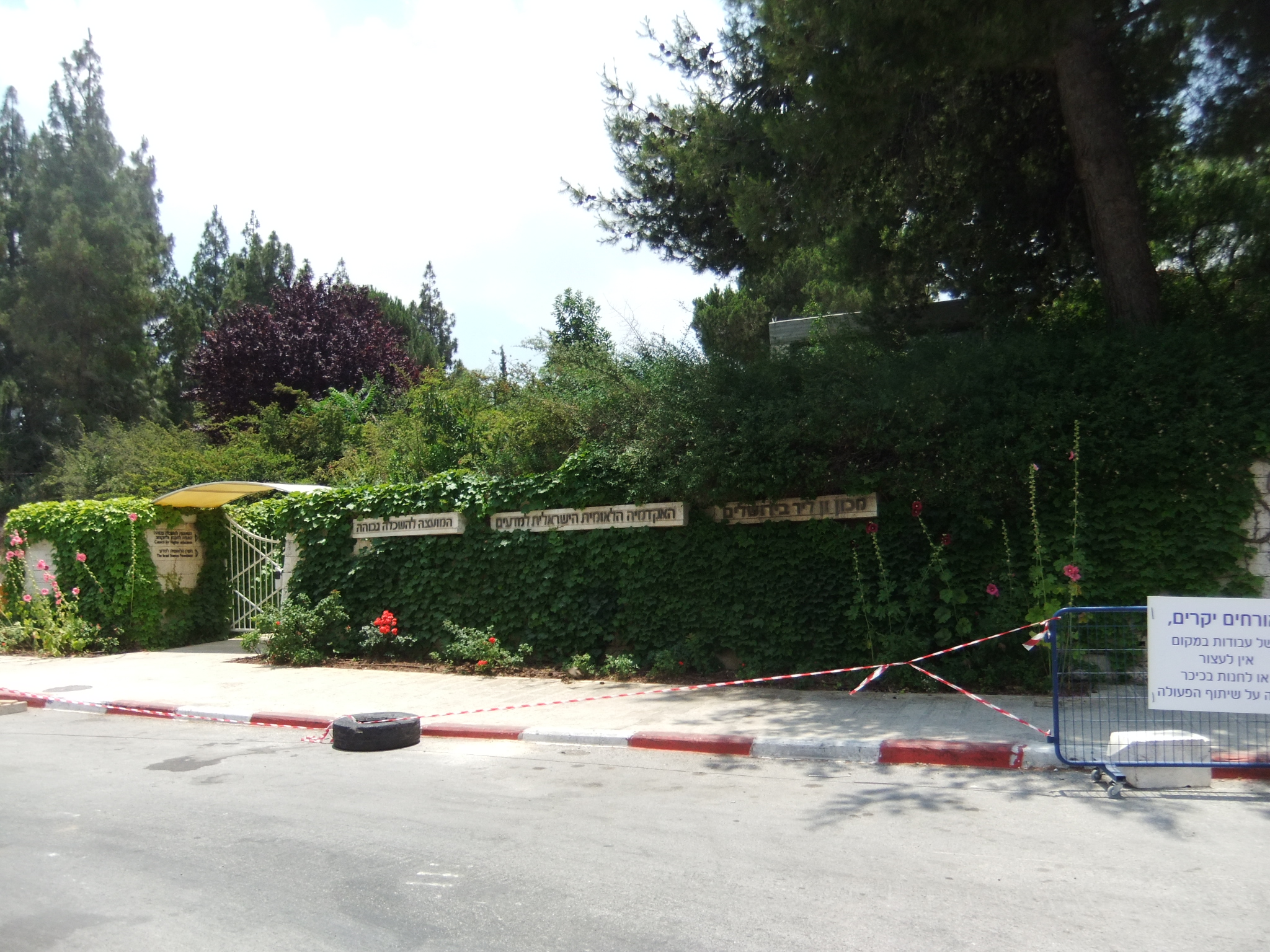
Entrance to the Israel Academy of Sciences and Humanities and the Council for Higher Education in Israel.

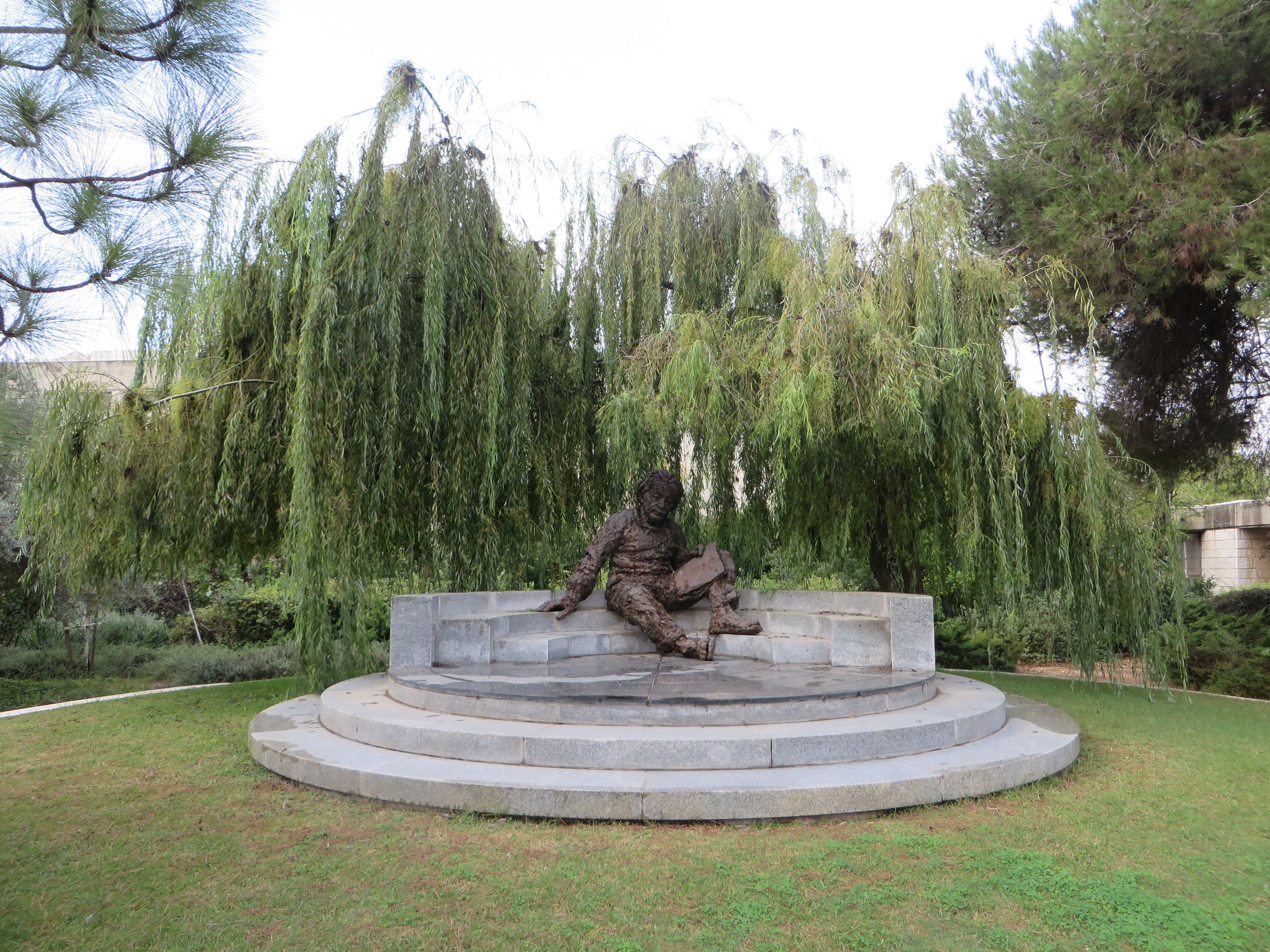
The garden of the Israel Academy of Sciences and Humanities.

Israel Academy of Sciences and Humanities, based in Jerusalem, was established in 1961 by the State of Israel to foster contact between Israeli scholars in the sciences and humanities and create a think tank for advising the government on research projects of national importance. Its members include many of Israel's most distinguished scholars.

The offices of the Israel Academy of Sciences and Humanities are located next door to the official residence of the President of Israel and the Council for Higher Education in Israel in Albert Einstein Square in Jerusalem.

In the sciences, the Academy funds projects on the geology, flora, and fauna of Israel, and facilitates the participation of Israeli scientists in research at international projects, such as high-energy physics at CERN and synchrotron radiation at the European Synchrotron Radiation Facility. Israel has the highest concentration of scientists and engineers in the world. The academy funds a number of prestigious awards in the sciences including the Alon Prize.

In the humanities, research is funded into the study of the Tanakh and Talmud, Jewish history, Jewish philosophy, Jewish art, and the Hebrew language, as well as Hebrew prose and poetry.

The Academy administers the Einstein Fellowships fund, which fosters relations between scientists from around the world and the Israeli academic community, the Israel Science Fund, with an annual budget of $53 million, and a number of research funds based on grants from the Adler Fund for Space Research, the Wolf Foundation, and the Fulks Fund for Medical Research. The Academy also runs the Israel Academic Center in Cairo, which assists Israeli scholars with research into Egypt and Egyptian culture, and facilitates cooperation with Egyptian academics.

The Academy has observer status at the European Science Foundation, and runs exchange programs with the British Royal Society, the British Academy, the Swedish Academy, and the National Research Council of Singapore.

== Members ==
=== Present (partial) ===
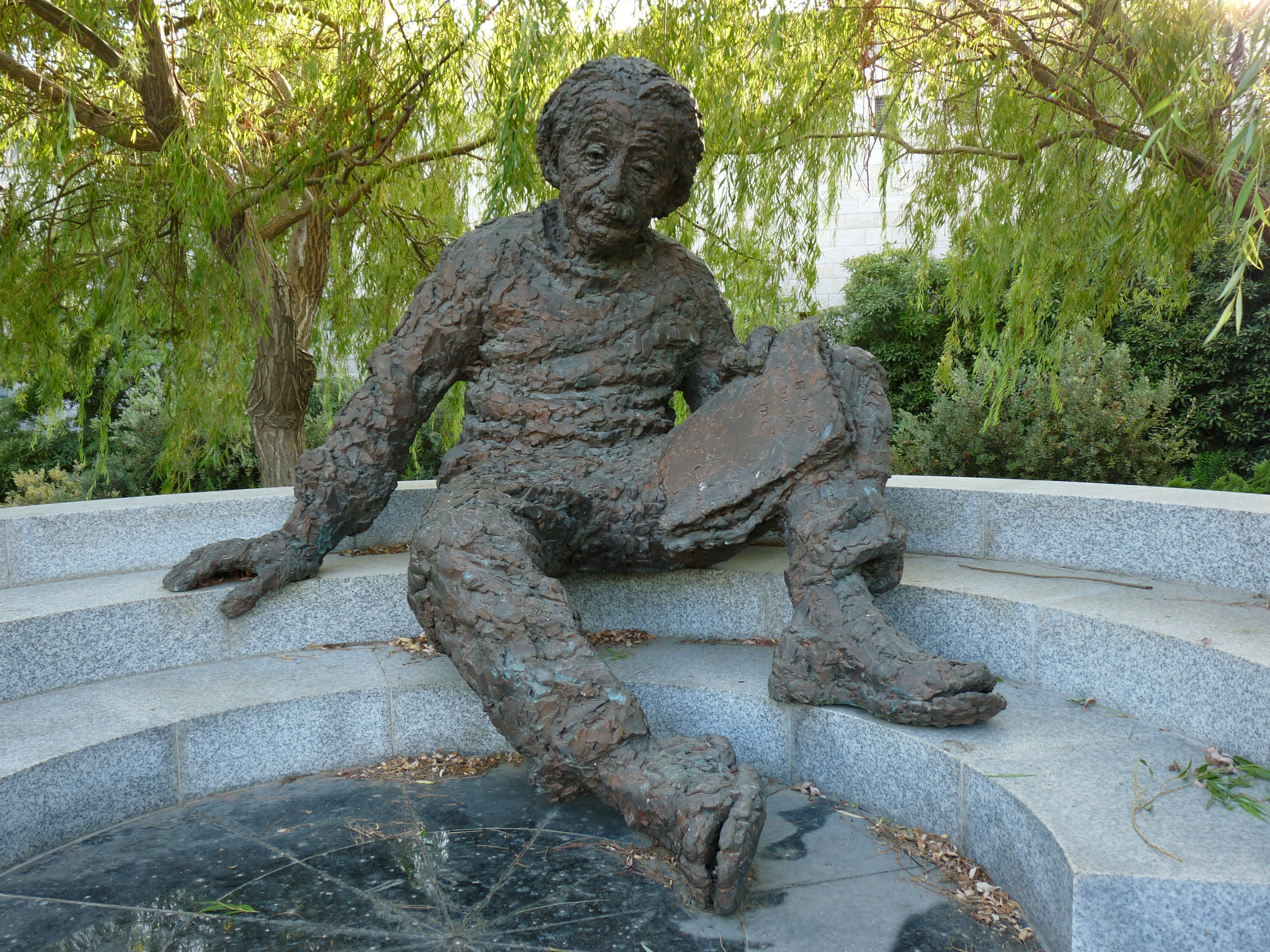
Statue of Albert Einstein in the academy garden, replica of the 1979 monument located at the US National Academy of Sciences.

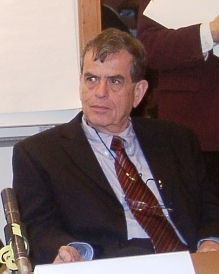
Nobel Prize winner Aaron Ciechanover

- Yakir Aharonov, Physics
- Noga Alon, Mathematics
- Ruth Arnon, Immunology
- Shlomo Avineri, Political science
- Robert Aumann, Mathematics, Nobel Prize (2005) in Economics
- David Ayalon, History of Muslim People
- Meir Bar-Asher, Islamic Studies
- Aharon Barak, Law
- Malachi Beit-Arie, Palaeography
- Ze'ev Ben-Haim, Hebrew Studies
- Joseph Bernstein, Mathematics
- Yehudith Birk, Agricultural Biochemistry
- Joshua Blau, Arabic Language and Literature
- Haim (Howard) Cedar, Biochemistry, Molecular Cell Biology, Molecular Genetics
- Ilan Chet, Agricultural Biotechnology
- Aaron Ciechanover, Biochemistry, Nobel Prize (2004) in Chemistry
- Nili Cohen, Law
- Solly Cohen, Experimental Physics
- Yadin Dudai, Neurobiology
- Itzhak Englard, Law
- Michael Feldman, Molecular Cell Biology
- Margalit Finkelberg, Classical Philology
- Israel Finkelstein, Archaeology
- Yohanan Friedmann, Islamic Studies
- Daniel Friedmann, Law
- Mordechai Akiva Friedman, Talmud
- Dov Frohman, Applied physics
- Hillel Furstenberg, Mathematics
- Gideaon Goldenberg, Linguistics and Semitic Languages
- Amiram Grinvald, Neurobiology
- Yoram Groner, Molecular biology
- Avraham Grossman, Jewish Studies
- Ruth HaCohen, Musicology
- Don Handelman, Anthropology, Sociology
- Menahem Haran, Bible
- Haim Harari, Natural sciences
- David Harel, Natural Sciences
- Ehud Hrushovski, Mathematics
- Elhanan Helpman, Economics
- Avram Hershko, Biochemistry, medicine, Nobel Prize (2005) in Chemistry
- Yoseph Imry, Physics
- Benjamin Isaac, History
- Joshua Jortner, Chemistry
- Yosef Kaplan, Jewish Studies, History
- Benjamin Kedar, History
- Eitan Kohlberg, Asian and African Studies
- Asher Koriat, Psychology
- Raphael Levine, Chemistry
- Alexander Levitzki, Biological chemistry
- Alexander Lubotzky, Mathematics
- Raphael Mechoulam, Chemistry
- David Milstein, Chemistry
- David Navon, Psychology
- Ruth Nevo, English Literature
- Abraham Nitzan, Chemistry
- Ariel Porat, Law
- Michael O. Rabin, Mathematics
- Ariel Rubinstein, Economics
- Leo Sachs, Biology
- Michael Sela, Immunology
- Uri Seligson, Hematology
- Shaul Shaked, Iranian Studies, Religious Studies
- Adi Shamir, Applied mathematics
- Dan Shechtman, Materials Engineering
- Saharon Shelah, Mathematics
- Uri Sivan,
- Yechezkel Stein, Medicine
- Zehev Tadmor, Chemical Engineering polymers
- Igal Talmi, Particle Physics
- Daniel Weihs,
- Meir Wilchek, Biophysics
- Itamar Willner, Chemistry
- Menahem Yaari, Economy

=== Past (partial) ===
- Shraga Abramson, Talmud
- Saul Adler, Parasitology
- Shmuel Agmon, Mathematics
- Hanoch Albeck, Talmud
- Shlomo Alexander, Physics
- Shimshon Amitsur, Mathematics
- David Asheri, Classical Studies
- Yehuda Bauer, Holocaust Studies
- Haim Beinart, Jewish Studies
- Jacob Bekenstein, Physics
- Zvi Ben-Avraham, Geophysics
- Michael Confino, Russian and Eastern-European History
- Hillel Daleski, English Literature
- Amos de-Shalit, Physics
- Ben-Zion Dinur, Jewish Studies
- Israel Dostrovsky, Physical Chemistry
- Aryeh Dvoretzky, Mathematics
- Shmuel Eisenstadt, Sociology
- Ezra Fleischer, Hebrew Literature
- David Flusser, Religious Studies
- Abraham Fraenkel, Mathematics
- Gad Tedeschi, Civil Justice
- David Ginsburg, Chemistry
- Jonas Greenfield, Linguistics and Semitic Languages
- Louis Guttman, Sociology
- Georg Haas, Zoology
- Aaron Katzir, Physical Chemistry
- Ephraim Katzir, Biophysics
- Yehezkel Kaufman, Bible
- Abraham Kogan, Aeronautics
- Dorothea Krook-Gilead, American Literature, English Literature
- Jacob Licht, Bible
- Saul Lieberman, Talmud
- Shneior Lifson, Physical Chemistry
- Yoram Lindenstrauss, Mathematics
- Hans Lindner, Physiology
- Zvi Lipkin, Physics
- Benjamin Mazar, Archeology, Jewish Studies
- Isaac Michaelson, Ophthalmology
- Shlomo Morag, Hebrew Language
- Yosef Naveh, Epigraphy, Palaeography
- Yuval Ne'eman, Astrophysics, physics
- Henry Neufeld, Cardiology
- Franz Ollendorff, Electronics, Electrical Research
- Don Patinkin, Economics
- Chaim L. Pekeris, Applied Mathematics
- Ilya Piatetski-Shapiro, Mathematics
- Leo Picard, Geology
- Shlomo Pines, Philosophy
- Amir Pnueli, Applied mathematics
- Hans Jakob Polotsky, Linguistics
- Joshua Prawer, History
- Giulio Racah, Physics
- Markus Reiner, Theoretical and Applied Mechanics (deceased 1976)
- Haiim B. Rosén, Linguistics
- Nathan Rosen, Physics
- Nathan Rotenstreich, Philosophy
- Dov Sadan, Yiddish Language and Literature
- Jefim Schirmann, Hebrew Literature
- Gershon Scholem, Jewish Mysticism
- Moshe Segal, Bible
- Gershon Shaked, Hebrew Literature
- Nathan Sharon, Molecular Biology
- Ariel Shisha-Halevy, Linguistics
- Chone Shmeruk, Yiddish Literature
- Shmuel Shtrikman, Applied Physics
- Menahem Stern, Jewish Studies
- Izchak Steinberg, Physical Chemistry
- Hayim Tadmor, Assyriology, History of the Ancient Near East
- Jacob Talmon, Modern History
- Yoram Tsafrir, Archeology
- Naftali Herz Tur-Sinai, Hebrew Language
- Efraim Urbach, Talmud
- Haim Ernst Wertheimer, Pathologic Physiology
- Chaim Wirzubski, Classical Studies
- Israel Yeivin, Hebrew Language
- Ada Yonath, Structural Biology, Nobel Prize (2009) in Chemistry
- Moshe Zakai, Electrical Engineering
- Jacob Ziv, Electrical Engineering
- Michael Zohary, Natural Sciences Botany
- Bernhard Zondek, Natural Sciences Obstetrics
