= Shlomo Alexander =

Israeli physicist (1930–1998)

- שלמה אלכסנדר
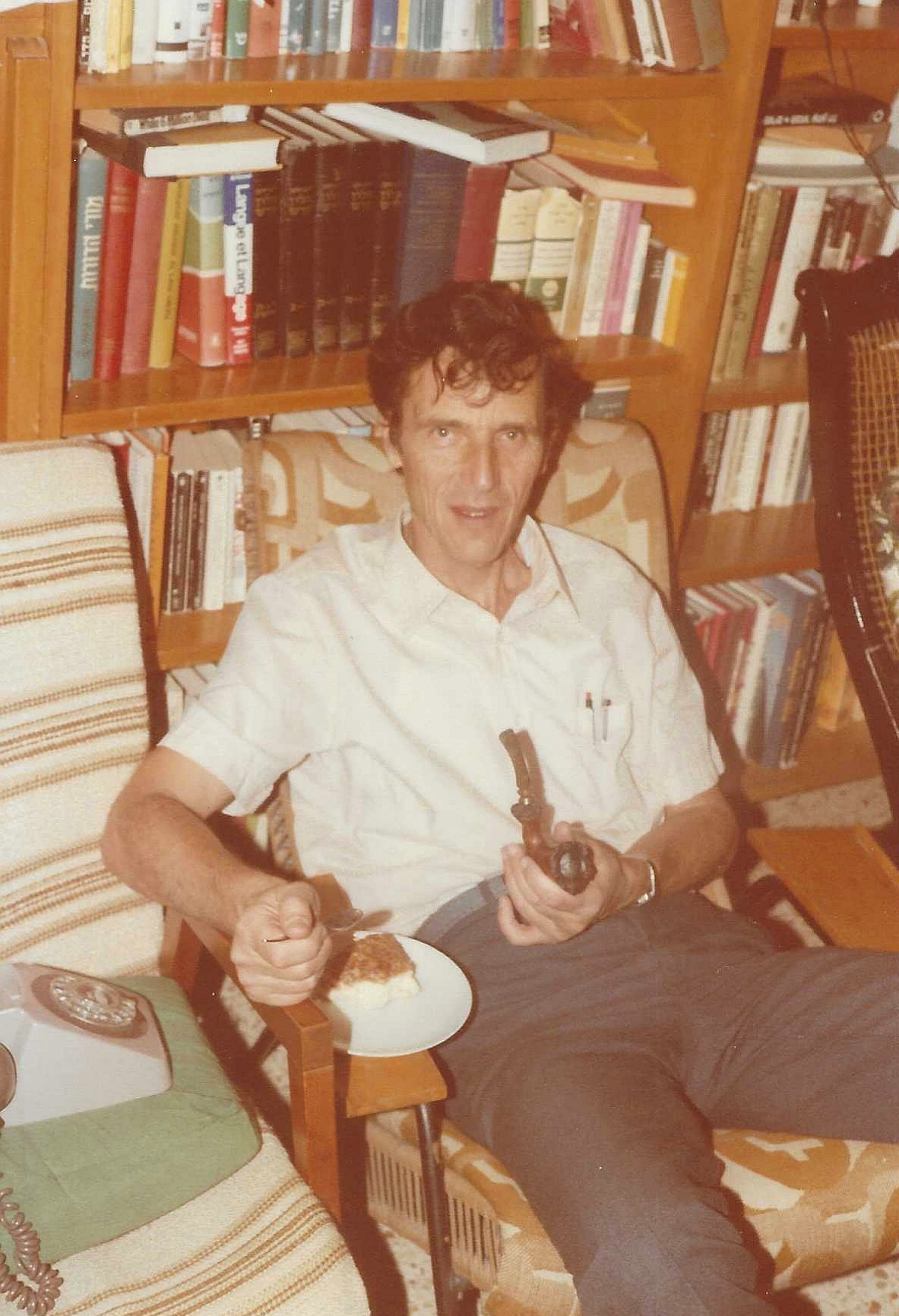
- Alexander in the 1970's
- Born: 4 September 1930; Freiburg im Breisgau, Germany
- Died: 7 August 1998 (aged 67); Caesarea, Israel
- Education: Hebrew University of Jerusalem; Weizmann Institute
- Children: 3, including Michal Alexander, Nitza Alexander-Levine, Amir Alexander
- Awards: Israel Prize (1993)
- Scientific career
- Fields: Physics; Condensed matter
- Workplaces: Weizmann Institute; Hebrew University of Jerusalem; University of California, Los Angeles
- Thesis: (1958)
- Doctoral advisor: Saul Meiboom

Shlomo Alexander (Hebrew: שלמה אלכסנדר; September 4, 1930 – August 7, 1998) was an Israeli theoretical physicist and winner of the Israel Prize, known for his contributions to the field of condensed matter physics.

== Early life ==
Alexander was born to Jewish parents in Freiburg im Breisgau, Germany. His father, Ernst Alexander, was a researcher at the Institute of Physical Chemistry at Freiburg University until he was dismissed by the Nazi authorities in 1933. The family then left Germany and moved to Jerusalem, where Ernst became a founding member of the nascent physics department of the Hebrew University.

Alexander grew up in Jerusalem and graduated from Beth Hakerem High School. After serving in Israel's 1948 War of Independence, he studied at the Hebrew University and earned an MSc in physics in 1955. In 1958 he earned a PhD from the Weizmann Institute in Rehovoth, under the direction of Saul Meiboom.

== Career and research ==
Though known for his theoretical work, Alexander began his career as an experimentalist. While earning his PhD at the Weizmann Institute, he helped build one of the earliest and most advanced nuclear magnetic resonance (NMR) spectrometers in the world at that time. This technology is the basis of the standard MRI imaging used today. In 1961 he travelled to AT&T's Bell Laboratories in New Jersey on a postdoctoral fellowship. Working closely with Philip W. Anderson, he studied the interactions between magnetic moments in metals and took part in experimental work on metals and superconductors. In 1962 he returned to the Weizmann Institute, where he established a laboratory for the study of pure nuclear quadrupole resonance (PNQR).

In 1969 Alexander moved to the Racah Institute at the Hebrew University in Jerusalem and became a full-time theoretician. He continued his work on NMR, but focused increasingly on condensed matter theory. Over the following decades he made important contributions to almost every subfield of condensed matter theory: metals, semiconductors, superconductors, glasses, granular materials, colloids, polymers, and many other fields in quantum materials as well as soft matter physics. During a visit to the College de France in Paris in 1976, he developed a scaling theory for polymers attached to surfaces with Pierre-Gilles de Gennes, which became known as the "Alexander–de Gennes brush". In 1978, with John P. McTague of UCLA, he developed the Alexander–McTague theory of liquid-solid transition that became standard in textbooks. Four years later, with Raymond Orbach of UCLA, he published the Alexander–Orbach conjecture on the density states of excitations on fractal lattices, which became one of the most cited works in the physics literature. Another influential work coming from his interactions with Fyl Pincus and Paul Chaikin at UCLA concerned "charge renormalization" in colloidal systems: the maximum colloid charge is that which barely binds a single charge to the colloid's surface.

While at UCLA, Alexander taught several courses attended by both faculty and students, working through examples that were often breakthroughs in unsolved problems. Starting in the 1980s he focused increasingly on developing a new fundamental description of the elastic properties of disordered materials. This ultimately led to his longest publication, a special issue of Physics Reports that appeared shortly before his death in 1998.

In 1978 Alexander was elected dean of the Faculty of Sciences at the Hebrew University, a position he held until 1981. In 1986 he joined the faculty of the UCLA physics department, while retaining his position in Jerusalem, and in 1989 he retired from the Hebrew University and moved back to the Weizmann Institute. By 1995 he had retired from his regular positions in Los Angeles and Rehovoth, while actively pursuing his research as a professor emeritus.

== Honors ==
Alexander was a member of the Israel Academy of Sciences and Humanities and the European Academy of Sciences. In 1993 he was awarded the Israel Prize in the Natural Sciences.

== Personal life ==
In 1951 Alexander married Hebrew University economics student Esther Vera Neumann (Esther Alexander, 1929–2005), who later became a prominent economist and activist for social justice in Israel. They had three children: Michal Alexander (b. 1956), Nitza Alexander-Levine (b. 1961), and Amir Alexander (b. 1963).

== Death ==
Shlomo Alexander was killed in a car accident near Caesarea, Israel, on the night of August 7, 1998. He was survived by his wife, his three children, and their families.
