= Nili Cohen =

Israeli professor and legal expert

- נילי כהן
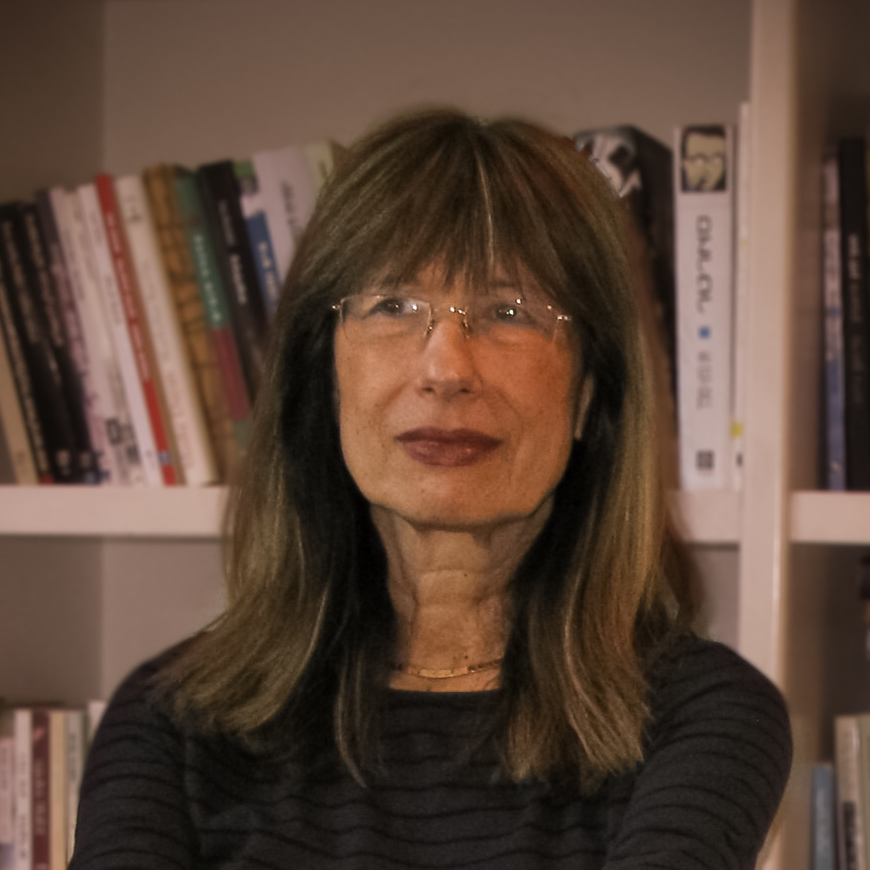
- Nili Cohen, 2014
- Born: 1947 (age 78–79); Kfar Saba, Israel
- Education: Tel Aviv University
- Occupations: Professor, legal expert

Nili Cohen (Hebrew: נילי כהן; born 1947) is an Israel professor and legal expert. She is a recipient of the Israel Prize, and was the President of the Israel Academy of Sciences and Humanities, succeeding Ruth Arnon, Cohen's role model. She is a member of the Academia Europaea, of the American Philosophical Society, and a foreign member of the accademia dei lincei.

== Biography ==
Nili Cohen was born in Kfar Saba, 1947. She grew up and was educated in Tel Aviv and graduated from Ironi Dalet High School. Her father was a teacher in that city. Cohen's grandmother, Batsheva (Bertha) Friedberg Grabelsky, lived in Manhattan, and married a Ukraine immigrant, Boris Grabelsky. Bertha was an editor, translator, Hebraist, and Zionist, who, in the 1920s, published Eden, a newspaper for Jewish teenagers.

An alumnus of Tel Aviv University (TAU), where Cohen received her LL.B., LL.M., and Ph.D. degrees, she was the co-founding editor of the TAU Law Review. In 1998, Cohen received an Honorary Degree from the University of Buenos Aires.

She serves as the Benno Gitter Chair in Comparative Contract Law. From 1994 to 1997, she was the Vice-Rector (1994–1997) of TAU, and served as the Rector from 1997 till 2001. She is the Professor emeritus of TAU's Buchmann Faculty of Law. Cohen became a member of the Israel Academy of Sciences in 2004, and was elected its president in 2015.

She was a candidate for Supreme Court of Israel, but her appointment was blocked in a process that garnered political attention.

Cohen is a widow; her husband, Amiram Cohen, had been a lawyer. They have two daughters and one son.

== Affiliations ==
- Member, American Law Institute
- Member, Academic Council of Venice International University
- Associate Member, International Academy for Comparative Law
- Former member, Committee of the Codification of Israeli Law
- Member, American Philosophical Society

== Awards ==
- 2003/4, 2004/5, and 2014/5, Rector Prize for Excellence in Teaching
- 2002, Minkoff Prize for excellence in Law
- 1986 and 1991, Sussman Prize
- 1989, Zeltner Prize

== Selected works ==
- Interference with Contractual Relations
- Inducing Breach of Contract
- Contracts A, B, C, D (co-author)
- Comparative Remedies for Breach of Contract (edited with Ewan McKendrick; also contributed a chapter)
