= Izchak Steinberg =

Izchak Zvi Steinberg
- Born: Jerusalem, Mandatory Palestine
- Died: 22 March 2017; Rehovot, Israel
- Education: Hebrew University of Jerusalem; Weizmann Institute of Science
- Known for: Developing spectroscopic methods for studying the structure of macromolecules and proteins; studying the electrical activity of neurons; and developing theoretical models of ion channels
- Awards: Weizmann Prize (1993)
- Scientific career
- Fields: Biophysics, Neurobiology
- Workplaces: Weizmann Institute of Science
- Doctoral advisor: Ephraim Katzir

Izchak Zvi (Yitzhaka'le) Steinberg (2 June 1931 – 22 March 2017) was an Israeli biophysicist and neurobiologist, a professor in the Department of Brain Sciences at the Weizmann Institute of Science and previously in its Department of Chemical Physics. He served as the fifth dean of the Faculty of Chemistry at the institute and as head of the Division of Natural Sciences at the Israel Academy of Sciences and Humanities. He was awarded the Rothschild Prize and the Weizmann Prize for Research in the Exact Sciences. He was known for his expertise in studying the electrical activity of neurons and developing theoretical models of ion channels, as well as for developing spectroscopic methods for investigating the structure of macromolecules and proteins.

== Biography ==
Izchak Zvi Steinberg was born in the Geula neighborhood of Jerusalem, into a religious family. He was the third of four children of Tzipora (née Weissfish) and Mordechai Raphael Steinberg.

In 1950, he began a direct-track master's degree in chemistry at the Hebrew University of Jerusalem. He completed his studies in 1956 and subsequently moved to the Weizmann Institute of Science, where he pursued a PhD in biophysics under the supervision of Professor Ephraim Katzir. His doctoral dissertation, entitled "Clarification of the Structure of Polymers and Copolymers of Amino Acids Containing Proline and Hydroxyproline", was submitted in 1960.

After completing his doctorate, Steinberg moved to the United States and undertook two postdoctoral fellowships. The first was at Cornell University, under Harold Scheraga, and the second was at the University of California, Berkeley, under Howard Schachman. Upon returning to Israel in 1963, he was appointed to the faculty of the Department of Chemical Physics at the Weizmann Institute and was among its founding members. In 1968, he was appointed associate professor, and he subsequently became a full professor.

In 1974, he was appointed head of the department, succeeding its founder, Professor Shneior Lifson. He also held the Matthew Rosenhaus Professorial Chair in Physics. In 1984, he was appointed the fifth dean of the Faculty of Chemistry, serving in this position until late 1985. In 1987, he was elected a member of the Israel Academy of Sciences and Humanities, and from 1989 to 1992 he served as head of its Division of Natural Sciences. He retired in 1999. Over the course of his career, he was a visiting researcher at the Massachusetts Institute of Technology, Johns Hopkins University, and the National Institutes of Health.

Steinberg was married to Ruti, with whom he had three daughters.

== Research ==
=== Biophysics and spectroscopy for studying the structure of macromolecules and proteins ===
Early in his independent research career, Steinberg studied the long-range transfer of electronic excitation energy in proteins and peptides, particularly nonradiative transfer mediated by resonance interactions between chromophores. His research examined the factors determining the efficiency of energy transfer, such as the distance and relative orientation between chromophores and the overlap between their emission spectra and absorption spectra. In particular, he demonstrated how these energy-transfer processes could be used to investigate protein structure and conformation, including measuring distances between chromophores and tracking changes in molecular structure. This research formed part of the foundation for the development of Förster resonance energy transfer (FRET) spectroscopy.

Steinberg also developed novel spectroscopic methods for studying the structure of proteins and biological molecules:

- Circularly polarized luminescence (CPL) – Steinberg demonstrated from first principles that chiral fluorescent molecules emit partially circularly polarized light.
- Fluorescence-detected circular dichroism (FDCD) – Steinberg developed this spectroscopic technique, which measures the circular dichroism of chiral fluorescent molecules through variations in fluorescence intensity.

=== Research on nerve conduction ===
Steinberg's interest in neurobiology began during a sabbatical at the Massachusetts Institute of Technology in 1975–1976. In this field, he worked closely with the neurophysiologist Rodolfo Llinás of New York University. The two studied the synapse of a giant squid in order to develop a detailed model of synaptic signal transmission and characterize the relationship between presynaptic calcium current and postsynaptic potential.

Later in his career, Steinberg's research focused on the electrical activity of neurons and the mechanisms underlying its generation, regulation, localization, and propagation, from a theoretical perspective. One of his research areas was the molecular mechanism of ion channels in the cell membrane. The electrical potential across the cell membrane is generated and controlled by the flow of ions through channels embedded in the membrane, which switch between open and closed states. Steinberg studied the laws describing transitions between these states and developed a method for analyzing whether the behavior of ion channels could be described as a system in thermodynamic equilibrium. This analytical method was subsequently applied in experimental studies designed to investigate the mechanisms of ion-channel function.

Another area of his research was the propagation of electrical signals through the dendritic structures of neurons. Dendrites are branched extensions of neurons that receive signals from other cells and transmit them to the cell body. Steinberg developed a mathematical description of electrical propagation in dendritic structures, making it possible to examine the electrical behavior of dendrites as a function of their morphology and branching structure. The research was intended to help clarify the functional significance of the complex, branched structure of dendrites.

=== The Mechanochemical Machine ===
Together with Professor Aharon Katchalsky and Professor Abraham Oplatka, Steinberg built a Mechanochemical Machine demonstrating the action of a muscle converting chemical energy into movement. It is displayed at the Davidson Institute of Science Education.

== Awards and recognition ==
- Scholarship for outstanding achievement at the Hebrew University of Jerusalem (1950)
- Ed Lee and Jean Kemp Fellowship for doctoral students (1960)
- Rothschild Prize (1979)
- Member of the Israel Academy of Sciences and Humanities (1987)
- Weizmann Prize (1993)
