= Nathan Sharon =

Israeli biochemist

- נתן שרון
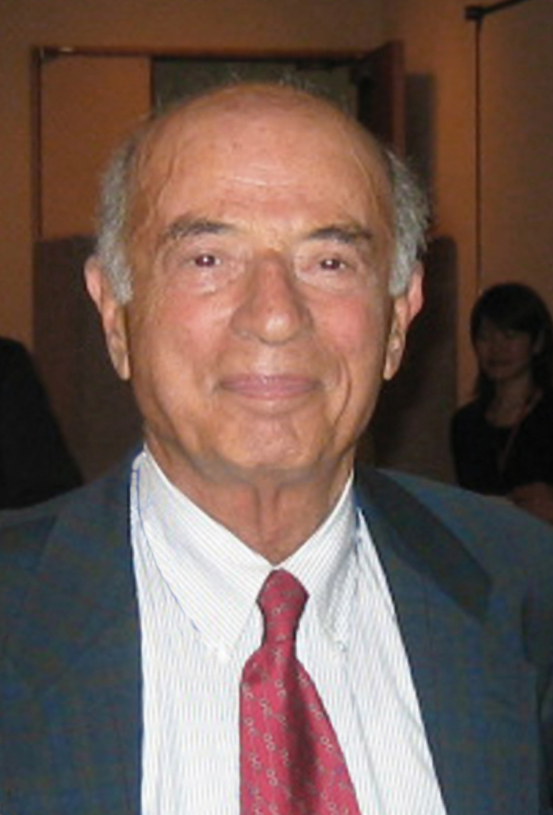
- Sharon in 2008
- Born: November 1925; Brest-Litovsk, Poland
- Died: 17 June 2011 (aged 85); Israel
- Education: Hebrew University of Jerusalem
- Known for: Biochemistry of lectins
- Awards: Weizmann Prize (1978); Israel Prize (1994)
- Scientific career
- Fields: Biochemistry
- Workplaces: Weizmann Institute of Science

Nathan Sharon (Hebrew: נתן שרון; November 1925 – 17 June 2011) was an Israeli biochemist.

== Biography ==
Sharon was born in 1925 in Brest-Litovsk, then part of Poland (now Brest, Belarus). He emigrated to Mandate Palestine with his family in 1934 and settled in Tel Aviv. Concurrent with his high school studies, Sharon joined the Gadna military youth program in 1941, and following his graduation from school, in 1943, he joined the Palmach, serving until 1945.

During the 1948 Arab–Israeli War, Sharon served in the Science Corps of the Israel Defense Forces, attaining the rank of lieutenant colonel, and he focused his work on the development of gas flame throwers.

Sharon studied chemistry at the Hebrew University of Jerusalem. In 1950, he graduated and, in 1953, he was awarded a doctorate.

In 1954, he joined the faculty of the Department for Biophysics at the Weizmann Institute of Science, headed by professor Ephraim Katzir, where he became a professor in 1968. In 1974, he was appointed head of the department, a position he held intermittently until his retirement in 1990. He also served as dean of the Faculty of Chemistry and Physics and was a visiting professor at Harvard, Oxford universities and the University of California, Berkeley. He was also a member of the senate of the Open University of Israel and a member of the council of the Tel Aviv-Yafo Academic College. He served as editor of "World of Science" broadcast on Israel Radio, editor of the journal "Mada" (Science) and science and technology editor of the Haaretz newspaper.

He was a leading figure in the research of carbohydrate and glycoprotein for more than fifty years. He authored several seminal works on lectins and glycoconjugates, including the discovery of lectins, their interactions with carbohydrates, and their subsequent use in laboratory research and diagnostics.

In 1992, he was elected to the Israel Academy of Sciences and Humanities.

He died on 17 June 2011 at the age of 85.

== Honours and awards ==
Sharon received numerous honorary degrees and awards including:

- 1987: Weizmann Prize for Sciences.
- 1987: Honorary doctorate from the University of Paris.
- 1989: Bijvoet Medal of the Bijvoet Center for Biomolecular Research, Utrecht University, NL
- 1994: Israel Prize in biochemistry.

== Family ==
Sharon married Rachel (Itzikson) in 1948 and has two daughters, Esther (Esty) Sharon, and Osnat Bairey.

He was the nephew of Pinchas Sapir, the former Israeli Finance Minister and the brother of Shmuel Shtrikman, who was awarded the 2001 Israel Prize for physics.

== Selected works ==
Sharon published over 400 papers in international scientific journals and wrote or edited eight books in English and Hebrew. His published works include:

- Lectins, co-authored with Halina Lis (Kluwer Academic Publishers, 2003 (2nd edition)).

== See also ==
- List of Israel Prize recipients
