= Isaac Michaelson =

Israeli ophthalmologist and member of the Israel Academy of Sciences and Humanities

Isaac Claude Michaelson
- יצחק קלוד מייכלסון
- Born: 1903; Edinburgh, Scotland, United Kingdom
- Died: 16 June 1982 (aged 78–79); Jerusalem, Israel
- Education: University of Glasgow; University of Edinburgh
- Occupations: Ophthalmologist, professor
- Awards: Israel Prize (1960)

Academic work
- Institutions: Hebrew University of Jerusalem

Isaac Claude Michaelson (Hebrew: יצחק קלוד מייכלסון; 1903 – June 16, 1982) was an Israeli ophthalmologist and member of the Israel Academy of Sciences and Humanities.

== Biography ==
Michaelson was born in 1903 in Edinburgh, Scotland, United Kingdom. He studied ophthalmology at the University of Glasgow and the University of Edinburgh, graduating in 1927.

The development of the retina was the basis of much of Michaelson's research and of many of his publications. Michaelson worked as a pathologist in an eye disease hospital in Glasgow and served as a lecturer at the University of Glasgow.

During World War II, Michaelson was an advisor to the British Army on ophthalmology and served in Egypt.

In 1948, Michaelson completed his doctorate and emigrated with his family to Israel. He was initially an advisor to the Israel Defense Forces and worked as an eye surgeon.

In 1949, Michaelson was named director of the department of ophthalmology at Rambam Hospital, Haifa, and, in 1954, became director of the department of ophthalmology at Hadassah University Hospital in Jerusalem, which subsequently became, under his management, the Ophthalmology Research Center. He was also appointed as a professor at the medical school of the Hebrew University of Jerusalem.

Much of Michaelson's work was to assist developing countries, particularly in Africa, and in 1971, he initiated the International Conference on the Prevention of Blindness. After his retirement from Hadassah Hospital in 1973, he acted in blind rehabilitation.

Michaelson established the Jerusalem Institute for the Prevention of Blindness.

== Awards ==
- In 1960, Michaelson was awarded the Israel Prize, in medicine.

== See also ==
- List of Israel Prize recipients
