= Albert Einstein Square =

Public square in Jerusalem

Coordinates: 31°46′15″N 35°12′54″E

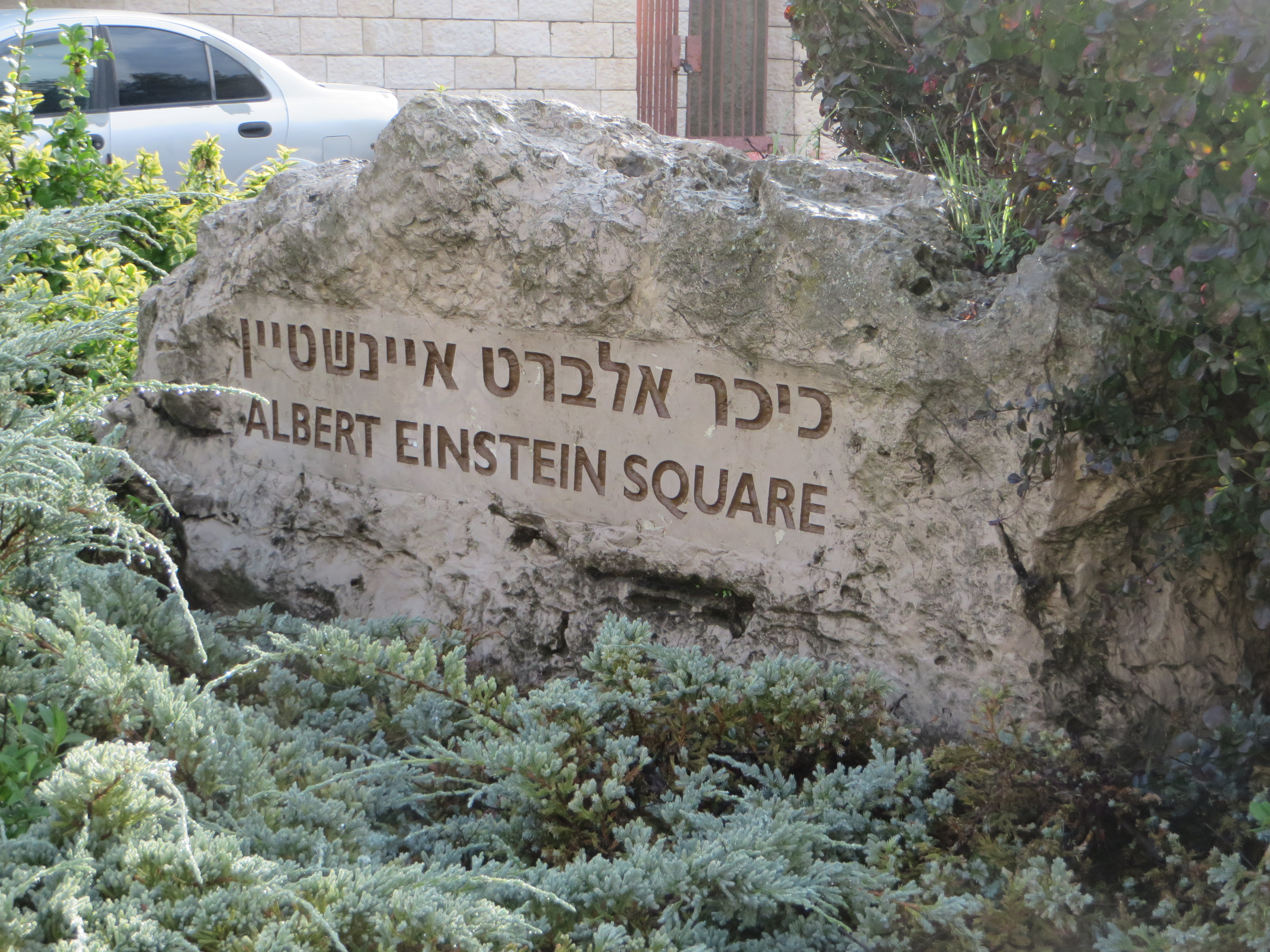
Albert Einstein Square sign, Jerusalem, Israel.

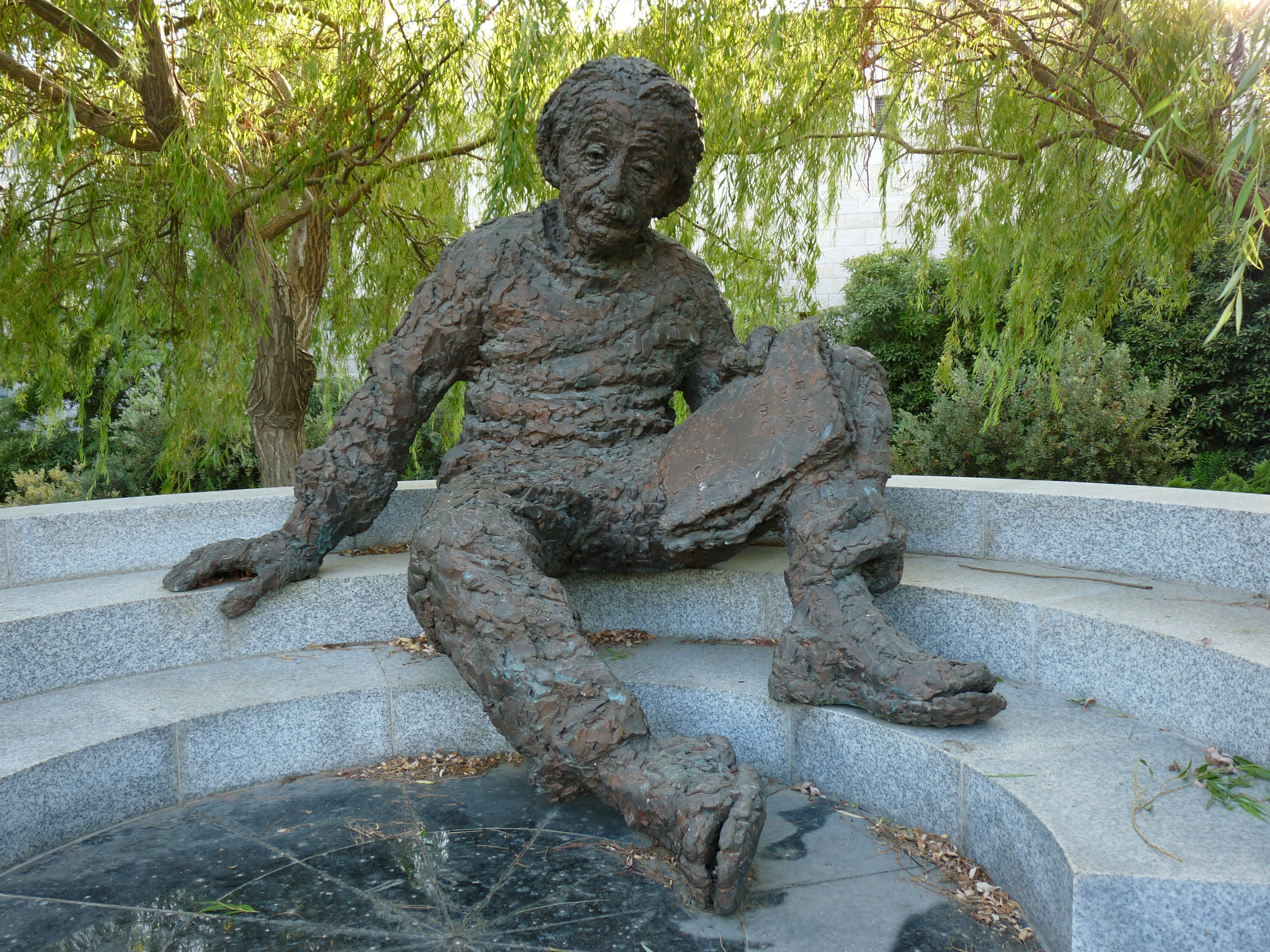
Statue of Albert Einstein in the garden of Israel Academy of Sciences and Humanities located at Albert Einstein Square, a replica of the 1979 monument located at the US National Academy of Sciences.

Albert Einstein Square (Kikar Albert Einstein) is a public square in Jerusalem, Israel, named for the physicist Albert Einstein. It is located in the Kiryat Shmuel neighborhood, on the grounds of the Council for Higher Education in Israel, Israel Academy of Sciences and Humanities, and Van Leer Jerusalem Institute.

== History ==
Albert Einstein visited Mandatory Palestine in 1923 for 12 days, giving the first lecture at the Mount Scopus campus of the Hebrew University of Jerusalem. Menachem Ussishkin, the president of the Zionist Executive, invited Einstein to settle in Jerusalem, but this was the only visit that Einstein made to the city. The Albert Einstein Archives are located at the Givat Ram campus of the Hebrew University of Jerusalem. Einstein was supportive of the Hebrew University in particular as well as Zionism and education in general, hence the naming of this square in association with several higher education and research-oriented institutions of national importance in Israel to honour Einstein, together with a statue of Einstein in nearby gardens of the Israel Academy of Sciences and Humanities.

Landmarks nearby are the Jerusalem Theatre and the official residence of the President of Israel. Further to the southwest is the Museum for Islamic Art.

== See also ==
- Albert Einstein Archives, Hebrew University of Jerusalem
