= Arieh Warshel =

Israeli chemist, biochemist and biophysicist (born 1940)

- אריה ורשל
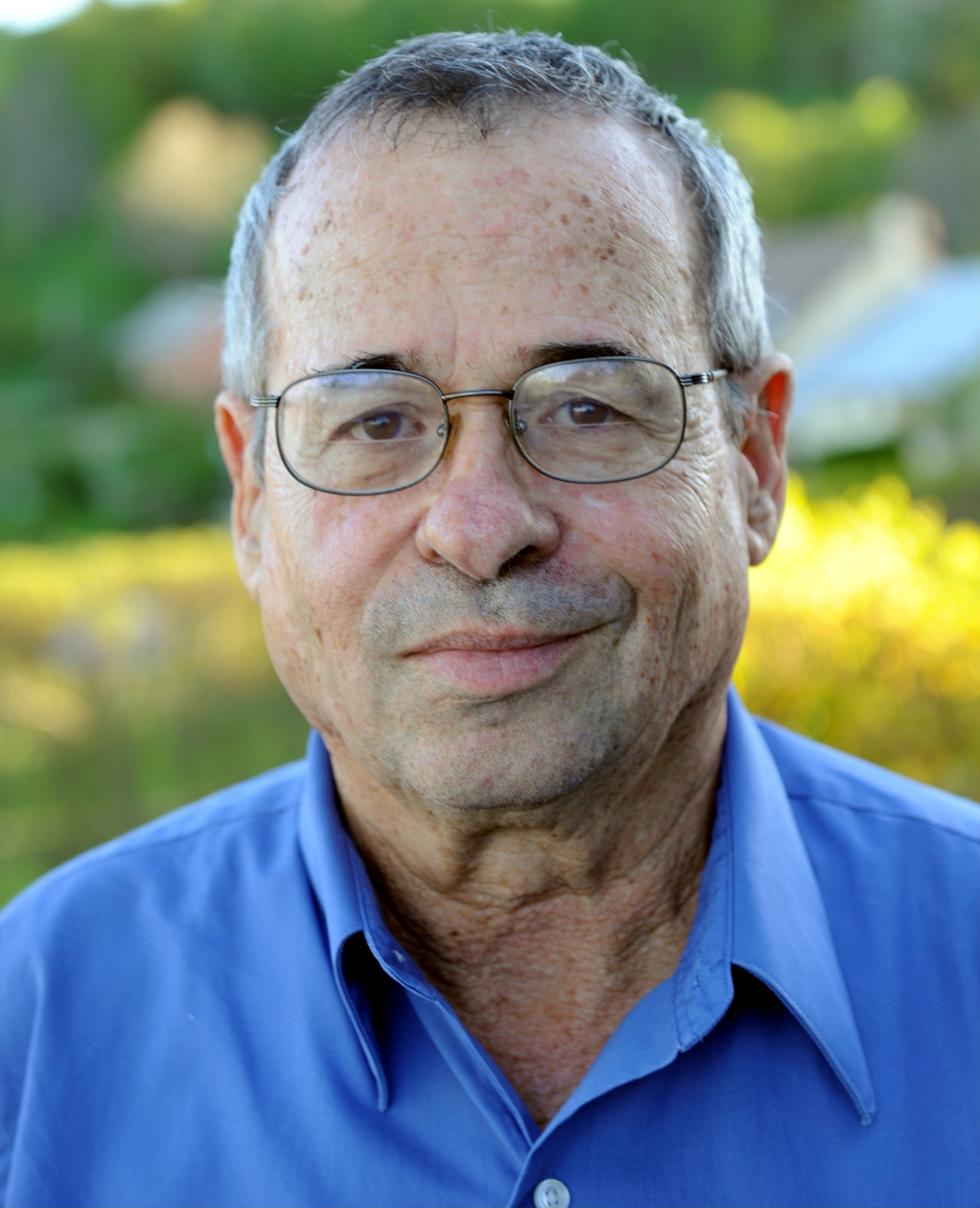
- Warshel in 2009
- Born: November 20, 1940 (age 85); Kibbutz Sde Nahum, British Mandate of Palestine (now Israel)
- Education: Technion – Israel Institute of Technology; Weizmann Institute of Science
- Known for: Computer simulation, Computational enzymology, electrostatics, enzyme catalysis
- Awards: Nobel Prize in Chemistry (2013)
- Scientific career
- Fields: Chemistry, biochemistry, biophysics
- Workplaces: Weizmann Institute of Science; University of Southern California
- Doctoral advisor: Shneior Lifson
- Website: laetro.usc.edu

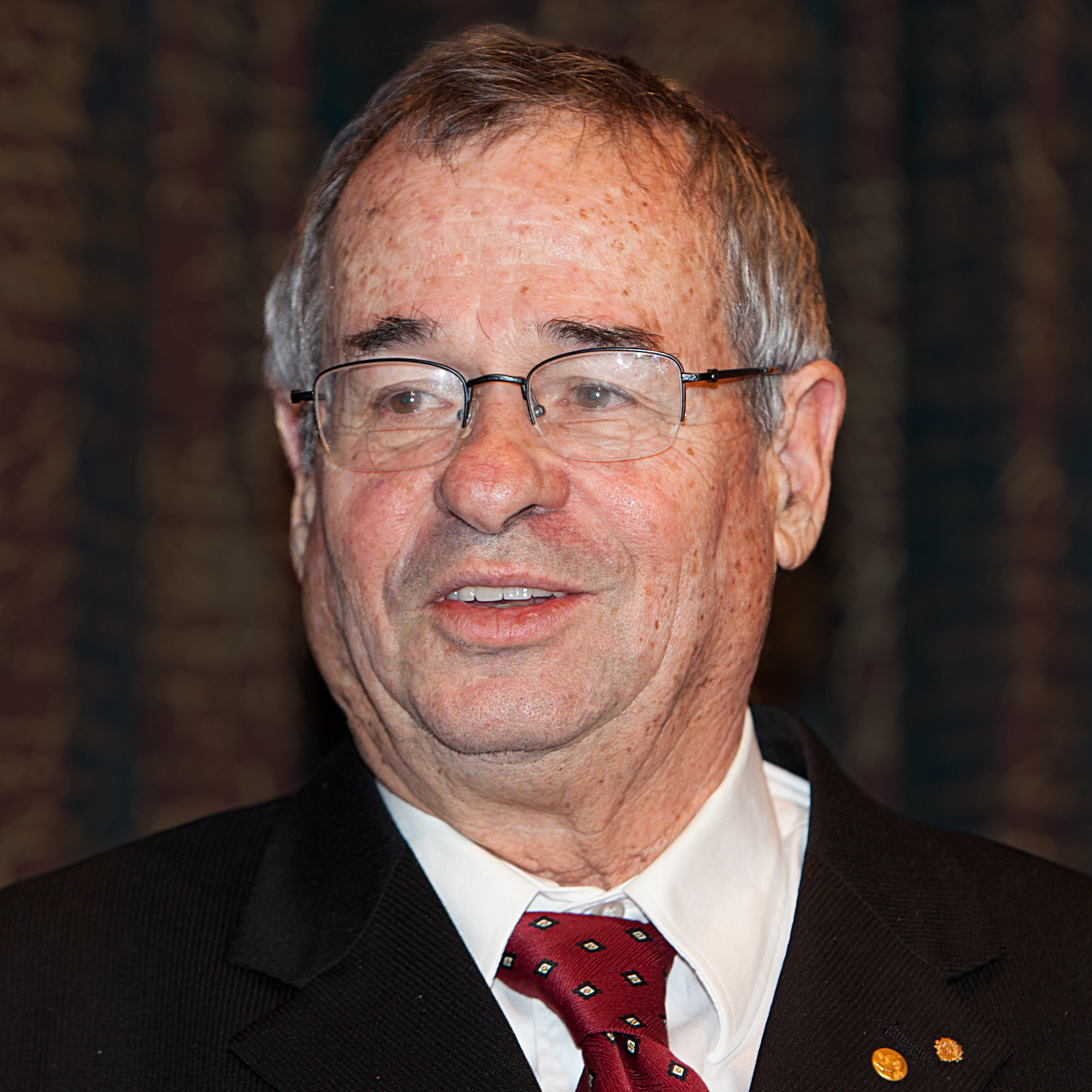
Warshel at press conference at the Royal Swedish Academy of Sciences in Stockholm, December 2013

Arieh Warshel (Hebrew: אריה ורשל; born November 20, 1940) is an Israeli-American biochemist and biophysicist. He is a pioneer in computational studies on functional properties of biological molecules, Distinguished Professor of Chemistry and Biochemistry, and holds the Dana and David Dornsife Chair in Chemistry at the University of Southern California. He received the 2013 Nobel Prize in Chemistry, together with Michael Levitt and Martin Karplus for "the development of multiscale models for complex chemical systems".

== Biography ==
Warshel was born to a Jewish family in 1940 in kibbutz Sde Nahum, Mandatory Palestine. Warshel served in the Israeli Armored Corps. After serving the Israeli Army (final rank Captain), Warshel attended the Technion, Haifa, where he received his BSc degree in chemistry, summa cum laude, in 1966. Subsequently, he earned both MSc and PhD degrees in Chemical Physics (in 1967 and 1969, respectively), with Shneior Lifson at Weizmann Institute of Science, Israel. After his PhD, he did postdoctoral work at Harvard University until 1972, and from 1972 to 1976 he returned to the Weizmann Institute and worked for the Laboratory of Molecular Biology, Cambridge, England. After being denied tenure by Weizmann Institute in 1976, he joined the faculty of the department of chemistry at USC. He was awarded the 2013 Nobel Prize in Chemistry.

As a soldier, he fought in both the 1967 Six-Day War and the 1973 Yom Kippur War, attaining the rank of captain in the IDF.

== Current activities ==
As part of Shenzhen's 13th Five-Year Plan funding research in emerging technologies and opening "Nobel laureate research labs", in April 2017 he opened the Warshel Institute for Computational Biology at the Chinese University of Hong Kong, Shenzhen campus.

In 2025, Warshel was elected to the Serbian National Academy of Science (SASA), recognizing his continued contributions to scientific innovation and discovery.

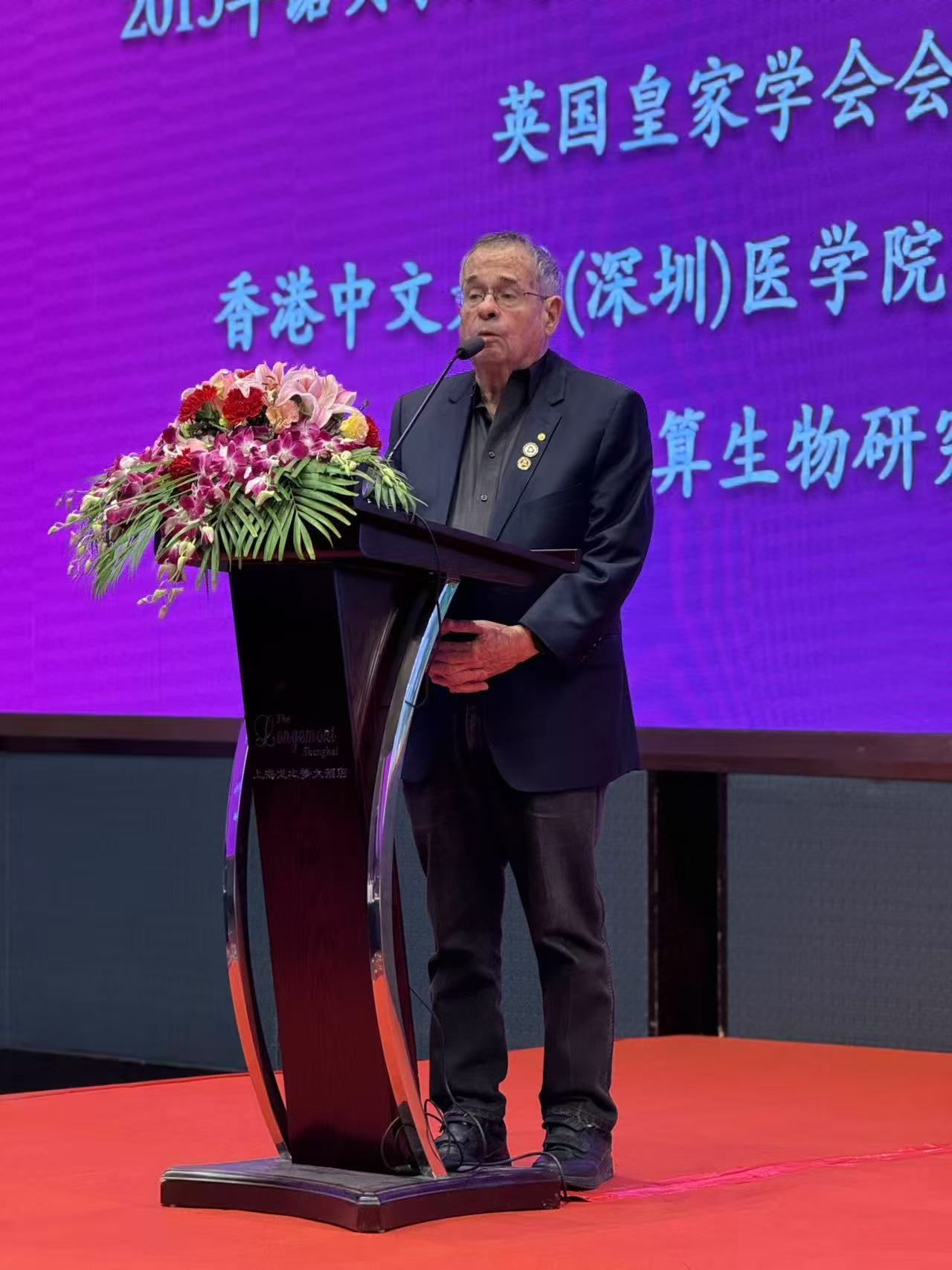
Arieh Warshel representing The Chinese University of Hong Kong, Shenzhen in Shanghai China 2025.

== Honors ==
Warshel is known for his work on computational biochemistry and biophysics, in particular for pioneering computer simulations of the functions of biological systems, and for developing what is known today as Computational Enzymology. He is a member of many scientific organisations, most importantly:

- Elected member of the United States National Academy of Sciences (2009)
- Fellow of the Royal Society of Chemistry (2008)
- Fellow of the Biophysical Society (2000)
- Fellow of the American Association for the Advancement of Science (2012)
- Honorary fellow of the Royal Society of Chemistry (2014)
- Honorary doctorate at Bar-Ilan University (2014)
- Honorary doctorate of the Faculty of Science and Technology at Uppsala University (2015)

== Awards ==
- Annual Award of the International Society of Quantum Biology and Pharmacology (1993)
- Tolman Medal (2003)
- President's award for computational biology from the ISQBP (2006)
- RSC Soft Matter and Biophysical Chemistry Award (2012)
- Nobel Prize in Chemistry (2013) together with Martin Karplus and Michael Levitt for "the development of multiscale models for complex chemical systems".
- Golden Plate Award of the American Academy of Achievement (2014)
- The Founders Award of the Biophysical Society (2014)
- The 2013 Israel Chemical Society Gold Medal (2014)

== Major research achievements ==
Arieh Warshel made major contributions in introducing computational methods for structure–function correlation of biological molecules, pioneering and co-pioneering programs, methods and key concepts for detailed computational studies of functional properties of biological molecules using Cartesian-based force field programs, the combined Quantum Chemistry/Molecular mechanics (i.e., QM/MM) method for simulating enzymatic reactions, the first molecular dynamics simulation of a biological process, microscopic electrostatic models for proteins, free energy perturbation in proteins and other key advances. It was for the development of these methods that Warshel shared the 2013 Nobel Prize in Chemistry.

== Books ==
- Warshel, Arieh. Computer Modeling of Chemical Reactions in Enzymes and Solutions. John Wiley & Sons, Inc., New York, NY. 1997.
- Warshel, Arieh. From Kibbutz Fishponds to The Nobel Prize: Taking Molecular Functions into Cyberspace. World Scientific Publishing, 2021.
- Warshel, Arieh. Electrostatic Basis of Biological Actions. World Scientific Publishing, 2026.

== See also ==
- List of Israeli Nobel laureates
- List of Jewish Nobel laureates
- Coarse-grained modeling
- Empirical valence bond

Awards
Preceded by Brian Kobilka; Robert Lefkowitz	Nobel Prize in Chemistry laureate 2013; With: Martin Karplus; Michael Levitt	Most recent
