= Shmuel Shtrikman =

Israeli physicist (1930–2003)

- שמואל שטריקמן
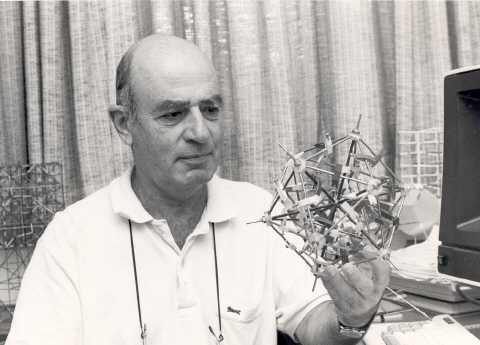
- Born: 21 October 1930; Brest-Litovsk, Poland
- Died: 11 November 2003 (aged 73); Rehovot, Israel
- Known for: Hashin—Shtrikman bounds
- Awards: Israel Prize (2003)
- Scientific career
- Fields: Applied physics
- Workplaces: Weizmann Institute of Science

Shmuel "Mula" Shtrikman (Hebrew: שמואל שטריקמן; 21 October 1930 to 11 November 2003) was an Israeli physicist, and a professor at the Weizmann Institute of Science. Winner of the Israel Prize for Research in Physics in 2003.

== Biography ==
Born in Brest, Belarus (then Poland) to Abraham and Esther Shtrikman, sister of Sapir and brother of biochemist Nathan Sharon. Shtrikman immigrated to Israel with his family in 1934. In the first year the family lived in Kfar Saba; a year later they moved to Tel Aviv. In the 1948 Arab–Israeli War he served in the Air Force.

Shtrikman began his studies at the Technion – Israel Institute of Technology in 1950. After graduation with a BSc in 1954, he joined the Department of Electronics at the Weizmann Institute of Science, where he did his doctoral degree in Electrical Engineering, received in 1958. In 1967 he was appointed professor at the Weizmann Institute. In 1981 to 1982 he served as head of the department of the Electronic Physics Institute. In 1994 he was elected to the Israel Academy of Sciences and Humanities.

His research concerned various fields of physics: the behaviour of particles under the influence of a magnetic field; liquid crystals; Lifshitz points; composites constructed from inhomogeneous distributions of ingredients; and calculating the elasticity of composite materials. His 1963 work with Zvi Hashin on the application of variational approach on the elastic behaviour of multiphase materials was influential on the theory of effective media and composites; the upper and lower-bounds for attainable effective constitutive parameters derived in this work are known as Hashin—Shtrikman bounds.

== Awards ==
Shtrikman received the following awards:

- Weizmann Prize for Science (1968)
- Michael Landau Prize (1975)
- IEEE Magnetics Society Distinguished Lecturer (1984 and 1997–1998)
- Ben Gurion University Applied Electronics Prize (1988)
- R. M. Burton Award by the Weizmann Institute Foundation (1988)
- Israel Prize in Physics (2003)
- Israel Defense Prize (1979 and 1987)

== Bibliography ==
- E. H. Frei, S. Shtrikman, and D. Treves, 1957, Critical Size and Nucleation Field of Ideal Ferromagnetic Particles, Phys. Rev. 106, 446. doi:10.1103/PhysRev.106.446
- Z. Hashin and S. Shtrikman, 1963, A variational approach to the elastic behaviour of multiphase materials: J. Mech. Phys. Solids 11, 127–140. doi:10.1016/0022-5096(63)90060-7
