= Council for Higher Education in Israel =

Body supervising Israeli universities

Council for Higher Education
- המועצה להשכלה גבוהה

Agency overview
- Formed: 1958
- Jurisdiction: Government of Israel
- Headquarters: Jerusalem; 31°46′13″N 35°12′58″E
- Agency executive: Maya Lugasi, General Director
- Website: che.org.il

The Council for Higher Education in Israel (Hebrew: המועצה להשכלה גבוהה, HaMo'atza LeHaskala Gevoha) is a supervisory body for universities and colleges in Israel. It is the only organization with the authority to award academic educational accreditation. The head of the council is always the minister of education, and at least two-thirds of its members are academics.

The council is located in Albert Einstein Square, Jerusalem, next to the Israel Academy of Sciences and Humanities.

== History ==
The first attempt at establishing a governing body for Israeli higher education was in 1952, in a bill presented by Yaakov Dori, which was not supported in the Knesset's education committee on the grounds that the proposed structure would impede academic freedom. A second attempt in 1955 similarly failed. In 1956 the government appointed a special committee, which was supposed to advise the government how to act, in order to assure that no ruling political party will be able to influence the academic institutions. The Governor of the Bank of Israel, David Horowitz, was the head of the committee, which advised the government to appoint a special apolitical and academic council which would supervise the functioning of the academic institutions and their relations with the government. Soon after, in 1958, the Knesset passed the Council for Higher Education Law, which established the organisation. The council was finally established in 1958. At that time most of the academic institutions were dependent on the governmental budget, and there was concern among academics that the government would politically influence higher education institutions.

In December 2005, new legislation came into force, which enlarged the student representation at the council from one to two members, one for university students and one for college students.

== Structure and responsibilities ==
The total budget of the council, which is funded by the government, is 6 billion NIS per year, which is then transferred to the public universities and colleges. Among its duties, the council is responsible for the establishment of new universities and the expansion of existing universities. To facilitate that and regulate the dispance of funds is the role of a dedicated body within the councel which functions as its executive arm called the Planning and Budgeting Committee.

The council has controlled Ariel University and other West Bank institutions since February 2018 after the Knesset voted to give it that authority. The council had previously had no legal standing in the occupied West Bank; Israeli universities and colleges there had instead been supervised by the Council for Higher Education in Judea and Samaria, which had been formed by a military decree and was abolished by the same February 2018 Knesset vote.

The most important body of the council is the committee for budget and planning, which deals with the division of funding between the various universities and colleges.

== See also ==
- List of universities and colleges in Israel
