= ANNNI model =

Variant of the Ising model

In statistical physics, the axial (or anisotropic) next-nearest neighbor Ising model, usually known as the ANNNI model, is a variant of the Ising model. In the ANNNI model, competing ferromagnetic and antiferromagnetic exchange interactions couple spins at nearest and next-nearest neighbor sites along one of the crystallographic axes of the lattice.

A typical Hamiltonian for this model is

$H = - J_0 \sum_{x,y} \sigma_{x,y} \sigma_{x,y+1} -J_1 \sum_{x,y} \sigma_{x,y}\sigma_{x+1,y} -J_2 \sum_{x,y} \sigma_{x,y}\sigma_{x+2,y}$

where $\sigma_{x,y}$ are the spins at the site $(x,y)$, $J_0 >0$ is a ferromagnetic coupling in the vertical direction, $J_1 >0$ is also ferromagnetic but in the horizontal direction, whereas $J_2 <0$ also works in the horizontal direction, but it is anti-ferromagnetic.

The model is a prototype for complicated spatially modulated magnetic superstructures in crystals.

To describe experimental results on magnetic orderings in erbium, the model was introduced in 1961 by Roger Elliott from the University of Oxford. The model has given its name in 1980 by Michael E. Fisher and Walter Selke, who analysed it first by Monte Carlo methods, and then by low temperature series expansions, showing the fascinating complexity of its phase diagram, including devil's staircases and a Lifshitz point. Indeed, it provides, for two- and three-dimensional systems, a theoretical basis for understanding numerous experimental observations on commensurate and incommensurate structures, as well as accompanying phase transitions, in various magnets, alloys, adsorbates, polytypes, multiferroics, and other solids. Further possible applications range from modeling of cerebral cortex to quantum information.
