= Daniel Weihs =

Israeli aeronautical engineer

- דניאל וייס
- Born: 1942 (age 83–84); Guilin, Guangxi, Republic of China
- Occupation: Aeronautical engineer

Daniel Weihs (Hebrew: דניאל וייס; born 1942) is the Israeli Louis and Lyra Richmond Chair of Life Sciences and Distinguished Professor Emeritus in Aeronautical Engineering at the Technion – Israel Institute of Technology, and the head of its Autonomous Systems Program.

== Biography ==
Weihs was born in Guilin in southern China, three years after his parents fled Austria for China. The family moved to Israel in 1949.

Weihs obtained his B.Sc. from the Technion – Israel Institute of Technology in 1964, his M.Sc. from Technion in 1968, and his D.Sc. from Technion in 1971, all in Aeronautical Engineering.

He has taught at Technion since 1973, became a Professor in 1982, and became a Distinguished Professor in 2002. Weihs holds the Louis and Lyra Richmond Chair of Life Sciences. He was Dean of Aerospace Engineering in 1987-1988, Director of the S. Neaman Institute for Advanced Studies in Science and Technology from 1990-1995, Dean of Graduate Studies from 1996-1998, Provost from 1998-2000, and Head of the Technion Autonomous Systems Program from 2007–present.

Weihs was Chairman of the Israel National Committee for Space Research from 2006-2015. He was Chief Scientist of the Israel Ministry of Science and Technology from 2010-2011, and Chairman of the Interuniversity Institute for Marine Sciences in Eilat from 2013-2018. He has published over 150 scientific papers.

He is a Member of the Israel Academy of Sciences and Humanities, a Foreign Member of the US National Academy of Engineering, and a Fellow of the American Physical Society.
