= Margalit Finkelberg =

Israeli historian and linguist

- מרגלית פינקלברג
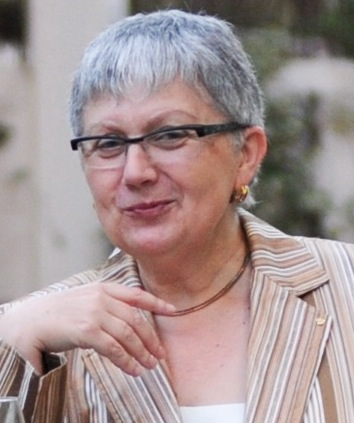
- Born: Маргарита Георгиевна Карпюк; 1947 (age 78–79); Minsk, USSR

Academic background
- Education: B.A., M.A., Classics, Moscow State University; PhD., 1986, Hebrew University of Jerusalem
- Thesis: Poetry in Greek thought before Aristotle: a study in early Greek poetics (1985)

Academic work
- Institutions: Tel Aviv University

Margalit Finkelberg (née Karpyuk; born 1947) (Hebrew: מרגלית פינקלברג) is an Israeli historian and linguist. She is the professor emerita of Classics at Tel Aviv University. She became a member of the Israel Academy of Sciences and Humanities in 2005 and served as president of the Israel Society for the Promotion of Classical Studies from 2011 to 2016. In 2021, she was elected vice president of the Israel Academy of Sciences and Humanities.

== Early life ==
Finkelberg was born in Minsk on March 8, 1947 and immigrated to Israel in 1975. She received a Ph.D. from the Hebrew University of Jerusalem.

== Career ==
Finkelberg began teaching in 1987 at the Hebrew University and from 1991 taught at Tel Aviv University. While there, she was the recipient of the 1991 Gildersleeve Prize from the Johns Hopkins University Press for the best article published in the American Journal of Philology. A few years later, while still teaching at Tel Aviv University, Finkelberg published The Birth of Literary Fiction in Ancient Greece in 1998. From 1999 to 2000, Finkelberg studied as a visiting fellow at All Souls College, Oxford, where she began to craft her future book Greeks and Pre-Greeks: Aegean Prehistory and Greek Heroic Tradition.

In the early 2000s, Finkelberg collaborated with Guy Stroumsa at the Institute for Advanced Studies at the Hebrew University of Jerusalem (now known as the Israel Institute for Advanced Study) to research "Mechanisms of Canon-Making in Ancient Societies." These efforts would later come into fruition in 2003, with their book Homer, the Bible, and Beyond: Literary and Religious Canons in the Ancient World. Despite this, Finkelberg still wrote about linguistics. In an article from 2001, Finkelberg claimed that there was a "high degree of correspondence between the phonological and morphological system of Minoan and that of Lycian" and proposed that "the language of Linear A is either the direct ancestor of Lycian or a closely related idiom."

Beginning in 2002, Finkelberg headed the Department of Classics at Tel Aviv University until 2006. In 2005, Finkelberg became a member of the Israel Academy of Sciences and Humanities. That same year, she also published Greeks and Pre-Greeks: Aegean Prehistory and Greek Heroic Tradition. From 2006 to 2007, Finkelberg was a member of the Institute for Advanced Study in Princeton, New Jersey. While there, she received funding to study the impact of Homeric poems.

In 2011, she was elected president of the Israel Society for the Promotion of Classical Studies and was selected to sit on the Committee for the Evaluation of Archaeology Study Programs at Ben-Gurion University of the Negev. The following year, Finkelberg edited the first Homer Encyclopedia, which was considered the first comprehensive reference work on the Greek poet Homer. She was also the 2012 Recipient of the Rothschild Prize in the Humanities. In 2013, Finkelberg sat on the Dan David Prize Review Committee for Classics, the Modern Legacy of the Ancient World. She was also Visiting Fellow at All Souls College, Oxford (2000) and an International Visiting Research Scholar at the University of British Columbia (2014). In 2016, Finkelberg stepped down as president of the Israel Society for the Promotion of Classical Studies.

She retired from teaching in 2017.

== Selected publications ==
The following is a list of selected publications:

- The birth of literary fiction in ancient Greece (1998)
- Homer, the bible, and beyond: literary and religious canons in the ancient world (2003)
- The birth of literary fiction in ancient Greece (2004)
- Greeks and Pre-Greeks: Aegean Prehistory and Greek Heroic Tradition (2005)
- The Gatekeeper: Narrative Voice in Plato's Dialogues (2019)
- Homer and Early Greek Epic. Collected Essays (2020)
