= Ruth Arnon =

Israeli biochemist

- רות ארנון
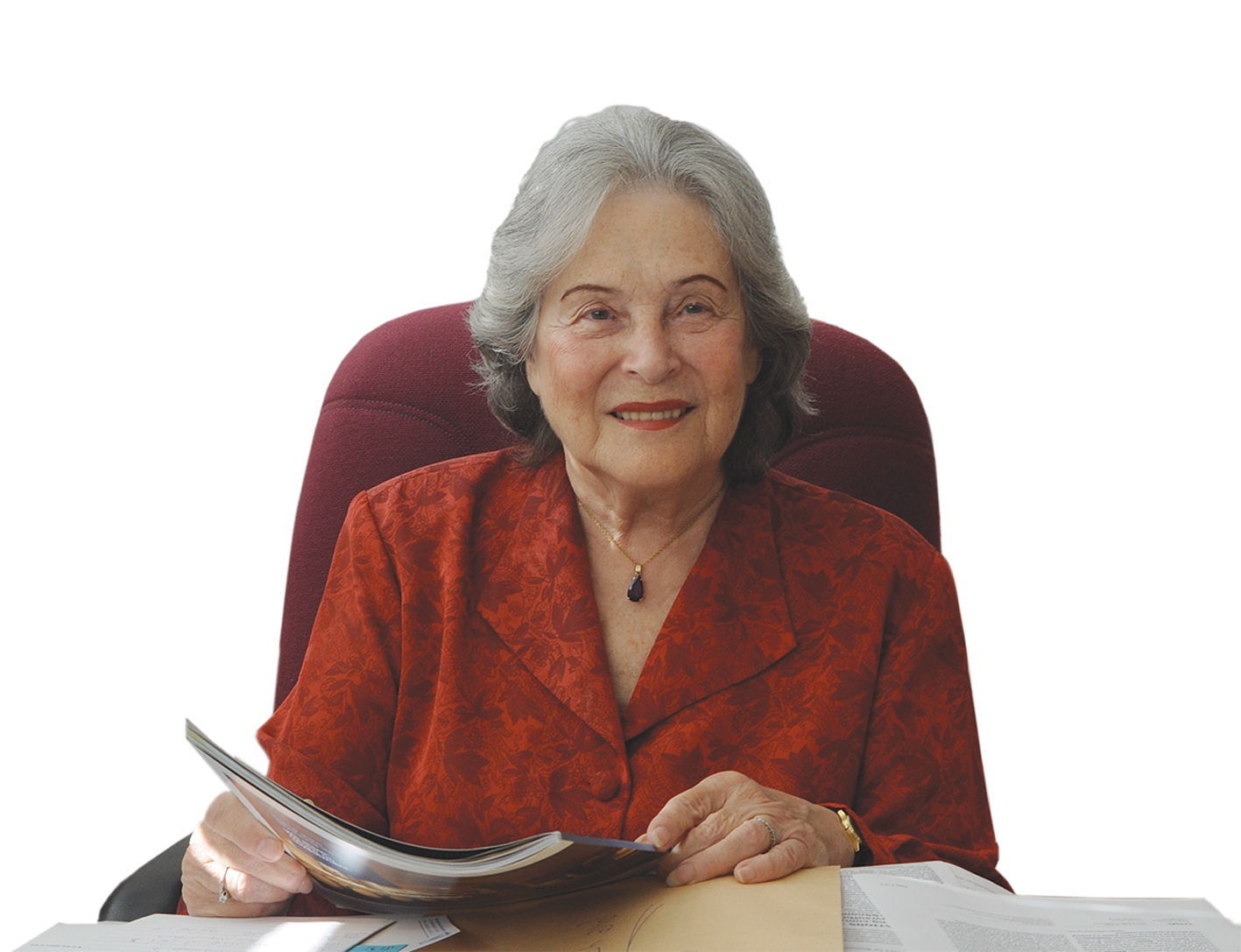
- Born: Ruth Rosenberg; June 1, 1933 (age 93); Tel Aviv, Israel
- Education: Herzliya Hebrew Gymnasium, Hebrew University of Jerusalem
- Known for: Copaxone
- Spouse: Uriel Arnon (2 children)
- Father: Alexander Rosenberg
- Awards: Robert Koch Prize (1979), Wolf Prize in Medicine (1998)
- Scientific career
- Fields: Immunology, Virology
- Workplaces: Weizmann Institute of Science
- Doctoral advisor: Michael Sela

Ruth Arnon (Hebrew: רות ארנון [ʁut aʁ'non]; born in Tel Aviv on June 1, 1933) is an Israeli biochemist and codeveloper of the multiple sclerosis drug Copaxone. She is currently the Paul Ehrlich Professor of Immunology at the Weizmann Institute of Science, where she is researching anti-cancer and influenza vaccinations.

== Biography ==
Ruth Rosenberg (later Arnon) was born in Tel Aviv, the youngest of three children. Her father, Alexander Rosenberg, moved with the family to Toulouse to pursue degrees in electrical engineering and mathematics. Upon their return to Israel, he worked for the Israel Electric Corporation. Arnon says her desire to study was inspired by her father. She attended Herzliya Hebrew Gymnasium and knew she wanted to be a medical researcher by the age of 15. She studied chemistry at the Hebrew University of Jerusalem, earning her M.Sc. degree in 1955 and served in the IDF. During her time in the military, she married Uriel Arnon, an engineer at the Technion in Haifa. They have two children: Michal (b. 1957) and Yoram (b. 1961).

== Scientific career ==
In 1957, Arnon began to work on her doctorate under Michael Sela. Arnon joined the Weizmann Institute of Science in 1960. She has focused most of her life on the field of immunology. While at Weizmann, Arnon served as the Head of the Department of Chemical Immunology (1975–1978), as the Dean of the Faculty of Biology (1985–1988), Director of the MacArthur Center for Parasitology (1984–1994), Vice President for International Scientific Relations (1995–1997), and as Vice President of the institute (1988–1992). In addition, Professor Arnon served as the Director of the institute's MacArthur Center for Molecular Biology of Tropical Diseases from 1985 to 1994. Much of Arnon's work has been in the development of vaccinations and cancer research. One of her largest contributions to science was working alongside Professor Michael Sela to develop a drug for multiple sclerosis called Copaxone. They, along with Devorah Tietelbaum who was at the time a doctoral student, discovered that a material synthetically produced in the lab could suppress a disease found in animals that is a model for multiple sclerosis. After thirty years of research Copaxone was approved for medical use.

Arnon served as the Chairperson of the Sciences division of the Israel Academy of Sciences from 1995 to 2001. She later was elected as President of the Israel Academy. She is also a member of the EMBO, the European Molecular Biology Organization. Arnon served as Secretary-General of the International Union of Immunological Sciences, the President of the European Federation of Immunological Societies, and is also a member of the European Union Research Advisory Board.

Arnon has published more than four hundred articles in biochemistry and immunology.

She was a visiting professor at the Rockefeller Institute (New York), University of Washington (Seattle), University of California (Los Angeles), Pasteur Institute (Paris), Walter and Elise Hall Institute (Melbourne), Imperial Cancer Research Fund (London), and the Curie Institute (Paris).

=== Copaxone ===
Arnon and Sela developed a new drug application for the treatment of multiple sclerosis called Copolymer 1. Its chemical name is glatiramer acetate. It was submitted by the TEVA Pharmaceutical Company to the FDA for approval, under the name of Copaxone, on June 14, 1995. Studies by Arnon et al. have shown an increase in myelination as a result of Cop 1. In a 2004 article, Arnon and Aharoni state that glatiramer acetate is "highly effective in the suppression of experimental autoimmune encephalomyelitis in various species."

=== Current Research ===
Arnon is researching a universal, recombinant influenza vaccination, as well as a cancer vaccine. A 2009 paper discusses the use of virus-like particles (VLP) to induce an immune response. These particles cannot replicate, but possess the specific antigen-presenting proteins that immune cells use to identify viruses. Therefore, a vaccine could introduce VLPs to an individual's immune system and bring about the production of memory cells. Arnon and Ben-Yedidia hypothesize that these vaccines would be effective against H5N1, a pandemic virus more commonly known as bird flu. They have tested the various synthetic vaccinations on mice and observed a significant immune response. In addition, they have put human lymphocytes in mice and also observed an immune response. Their research formed the basis of the company BiondVax, who have taken the universal flu vaccine into human clinical trials.

In 2017 Arnon was appointed co-chair of the UK-Israel Science Council, alongside Prof. Lord Robert Winston. She has been a founding member of the council since 2010.

== Awards and recognition ==
- 1979 – Robert Koch Prize in Medical Sciences, Germany
- 1986 – Jimenez Diaz Award, Spain
- 1990 – Elected Member of the Israel Academy of Sciences and Humanities
- 1994 – Chevalier de l'Ordre de la Légion d'Honneur, France
- 1997 – Hadassah Women of Distinction Award
- 1998 – Wolf Prize in Medicine for the development of Cop1, or Copaxone
- 1998 – Rothschild Prize in Life Sciences
- 2001 – Israel Prize in medicine
- 2009 – Elected member of the American Philosophical Society
- 2010 – First woman president of the Israel Academy of Sciences and Humanities
- 2020 – OurCrowd Maimonides Award for Lifetime Achievement in Science, Leadership and Menschlichkeit
- 2021 – Honorary Officer of the Order of the British Empire (OBE)

== See also ==
- Women of Israel
