= Shneior Lifson =

Israeli chemical physicist

- שניאור ליפסון
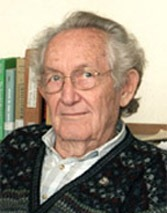
- Born: March 18, 1914
- Died: January 22, 2001 (aged 86)
- Education: Hebrew University of Jerusalem
- Known for: Helix-coil transition theory, consistent force field method
- Spouse(s): Hanna Lifson, married on April 9, 1946 (three children: Uri, Ilana, and Yaron)
- Awards: Weizmann Prize (1958)
- Scientific career
- Fields: Chemical Physics
- Workplaces: Weizmann Institute of Science

Shneior Lifson (Hebrew: שניאור ליפסון; 18 March 1914, in Tel Aviv – 22 January 2001, in Rehovot), was an Israeli chemical physicist, scientific director of the Weizmann Institute of Science, a founder of the Open University of Israel, and laureate of the 1969 Israel Prize in the life sciences. Lifson is best known for his consistent force field method, one of the major theories behind 3-D computer modeling of large molecules.

In 2013, two scientists who early in their career had worked under his guidance at the Weizmann Institute – Arieh Warshel, who was his Ph.D. student, and Michael Levitt – won the Nobel Prize in Chemistry. That research focused on the development and applications of the consistent force field method to molecular dynamics of proteins.

== Early years ==
Lifson was born in Tel Aviv in 1914, into a family of Russian immigrants. While studying at the Herzliya Hebrew High School, he became active in the Hashomer Hatzair youth movement. In 1932, after completing his studies, Lifson was among the founders of a new kibbutz, now called Nir David, in the Jezreel Valley, in which he served as a teacher in the natural sciences.

In 1942, he joined the Palmach underground army, but a year later was demobilized to pursue academic studies. After earning a B.Sc. in physics and mathematics, he returned to teaching, in a school of the kibbutz Mishmar HaEmek.

When the 1948 Arab–Israeli War broke out in 1948, Lifson was drafted into the science corps of the Israel Defense Forces, Hemed, serving under the command of Aharon Katzir, who was then Head of the Department of Polymers at the Weizmann Institute of Science.

== Career ==
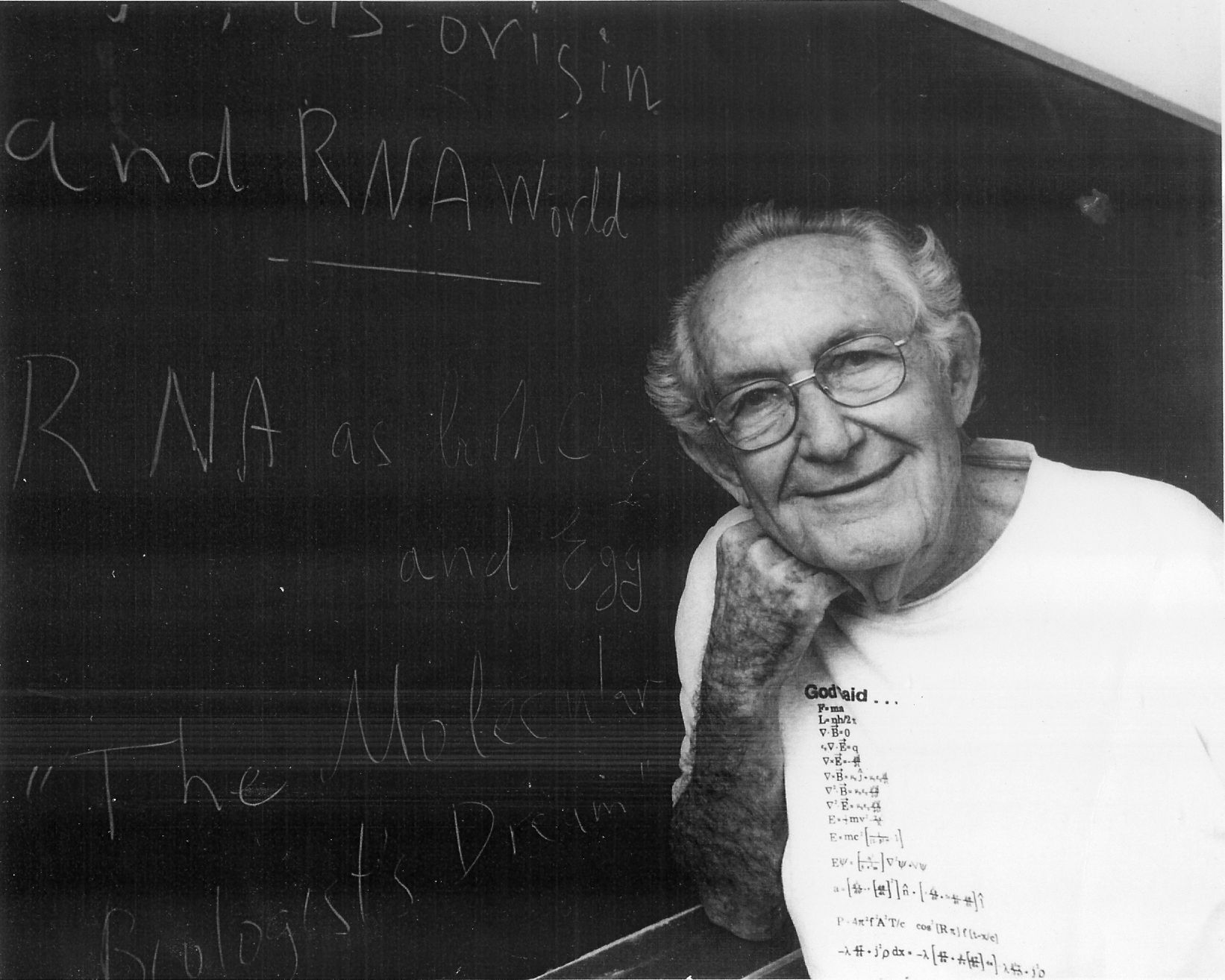
RNA as both chicken and egg, the molecular biologist's dream...

In 1949, Lifson joined Katzir’s department at the Weizmann Institute, while at the same time pursuing doctoral studies at the Hebrew University of Jerusalem under Katzir’s guidance. He earned his Ph.D. in 1954, focusing in his thesis on polyelectrolyte solutions. The research he conducted on this topic in the 1950s still serves as a cornerstone for understanding the behavior of charged macromolecules, biological and synthetic, in water solutions. The activity of such biological macromolecules as DNA, RNA, enzymes, and other proteins is altered by temperature, salinity, and other external conditions. Lifson used the methods of statistical mechanics to investigate the structural changes of these molecules in solution.

Later in his career, Lifson was the principal collaborator in formulating the theory of the helix-coil transition in biological macromolecules, a process whose clarification is essential for understanding structural changes related to protein folding. Lifson then developed a method for calculating the interactions among the forces that various molecular components exert upon one another. Known as the consistent force field method, it makes it possible to characterize molecules in mathematical and physical terms, as well as to predict and calculate the energy of interaction among their components.

The ability to compute the forces operating among various atoms with the help of Lifson’s method has facilitated a basic clarification of the structure and dynamics of biological molecules and eventually led to a breakthrough in understanding protein folding and diseases caused by defective folding. Today, numerous studies of protein folding are designed on the basis of predictions obtained through such computations. The consistent force field method also enables the precise planning of chemical reactions and the study of the function of various molecules in biological systems, among them the interactions between different proteins, the binding of ions to biomolecules, and the redesign of proteins. This method lies at the basis of theoretical computational approaches in modern structural biology. In industry, building molecular models using this method has enhanced the development of drugs, food additives, pesticides, and numerous other chemicals.

== Honors and Appointments ==
Lifson held numerous leading positions in research and education in Israel. He served as Scientific Director of the Weizmann Institute (1963–1967) and Dean of its Faculty of Chemistry (1972–1978). He founded the Institute’s Department of Chemical Physics and served as its Head (1963–1979).

In 1970, education minister Yigal Allon appointed Lifson to head a committee examining the need for an open university in Israel. The committee recommended that one be created on the model of institutions existing in the United Kingdom. Upon the establishment of the Open University of Israel, Lifson served as its first rector (1974–1975). He was also editor-in-chief of the Children’s Britannica in Hebrew, published starting in 1977.

Lifson's honors included the Weizmann Prize (1958), the Israel Prize (1969), and election to the Israel Academy of Sciences and Humanities (1999). He was appointed an Honorary Fellow of the Open University of Israel (1991), received an honorary Ph.D. from the Hebrew University of Jerusalem (2000) and was named Yakir Rehovot – “Distinguished Resident of Rehovot” (2000). He served on the board of trustees of Tel Aviv’s Cameri Theater and on the board of governors of Israeli Educational Television.
