= Amir Alexander =

Israeli historian

- עמיר אלכסנדר
- Born: Rehovot, Israel
- Children: 2

Academic background
- Education: Hebrew University of Jerusalem (B.S. 1988); Stanford (M.A. 1990; Ph.D. 1996)

Academic work
- Discipline: History of science
- Institutions: UCLA

Amir Alexander (Hebrew: עמיר אלכסנדר) is an Israeli historian, author, and academic who studies the interconnections between mathematics and its cultural and historical setting.

== Early life and education ==
Born in Rehovot, Israel, he grew up in Jerusalem where his father, Shlomo Alexander, was a professor of physics at UCLA and the Hebrew University and his mother, Esther Alexander, was an economist and social activist. He obtained a B.S. from the Hebrew University in Jerusalem in 1988 in mathematics and history, before moving to the United States, where he obtained an M.A. in history of science from Stanford University in 1990, and a Ph.D. in history of science from Stanford University in 1996.

== Career ==
His first book, Geometrical Landscapes: The Voyages of Discovery and the Transformation of Mathematical Practice, was published in 2002. The book describes the 17th century English exploration of the Americas, the early exploration by English mathematicians of infinitesimals, and the relationship between the two, and argued that "If a strong relationship can be established between an historically specific nonmathematical tale and the narrative of a mathematical work that originated within its social sphere, then mathematics can indeed be said to be fundamentally shaped by its social and cultural setting."

His second book, Duel at Dawn: Heroes, Martyrs, and the Rise of Modern Mathematics, was published in 2010. The book begins describing the death of Evariste Galois in a duel in 1832 and makes the argument that the ideas and culture of the Romantic age influenced the way mathematicians saw themselves and the very mathematics that they created.

His third book, Infinitesimal: How a Dangerous Mathematical Theory Shaped the Modern World was published in 2014. The book returns to the topic of the history of the study of infinitesimals in the 17th century, and locates arguments about the validity of the mathematical concept in the struggles between Roman Catholics and Protestants in the Reformation and Counter-Reformation and the accompanying political struggles between authoritarian and more pluralistic approaches to governing. Infinitesimal was selected as one of the best science books of 2014 by Library Journal and by Slate magazine. His fourth book, Proof!: How the World Became Geometrical, was published in 2019. His fifth book, Liberty's Grid was published in 2024 by the University of Chicago Press.

He has contributed pieces to The New York Times's Science and Book Reviews sections, The Los Angeles Times Op-Ed section, and Scientific American, and he has been interviewed on NPR's All Things Considered, and Interfaith Voices.

== Personal life ==
Alexander lives in Los Angeles with his wife and two children. He teaches history at UCLA.

== See also ==
- Yitzhak Baer
- Élie Barnavi
