= Michael Sela =

Israeli immunologist (1924–2022)

- מיכאל סלע
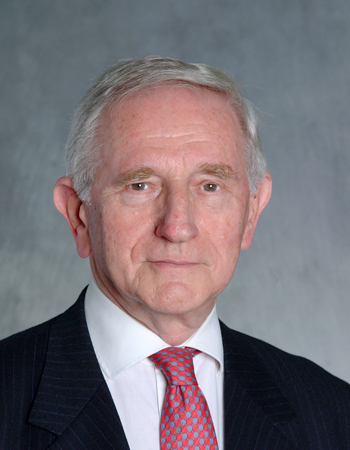
- Michael Sela
- Born: Mieczysław Salomonowicz; 2 March 1924; Tomaszów Mazowiecki, Poland
- Died: 27 May 2022 (aged 98); Rehovot, Israel
- Occupation: immunologist
- Known for: Research in immunology; President of the Weizmann Institute of Science
- Title: W. Garfield Weston Professor of Immunology at the Weizmann Institute of Science
- Awards: The Israel Prize in Life Sciences (1959); Germany's Otto Warburg Medal (1968); The Rothschild Prize (1968); Canada's Gairdner Foundation International Award (1980); Germany's Commander's Cross of the Order of Merit Award (1986); France's Officier de l'Ordre de la Légion d'honneur (1987); Interbrew-Baillet Latour Health Prize of Belgium (1997); The Wolf Prize in Medicine (1998)

Michael Sela (Hebrew: מיכאל סלע; Mieczysław Salomonowicz; 2 March 1924 – 27 May 2022) was an Israeli immunologist of Polish Jewish origin. He was a president of Weizmann Institute of Science in Rehovot.

== Early life and academic career ==
Michael Sela was born as Mieczysław Salomonowicz in Tomaszów Mazowiecki, Poland, on 2 March 1924. In 1935 when he was 11 years old he and his family moved to Romania. In 1941 when he was 17 years old he and his family immigrated to Mandatory Palestine. He studied at the Hebrew University of Jerusalem (M.Sc., Chemistry, 1946; Ph.D., 1954).

Sela was professor in the Weizmann Institute's Immunology Department. He was also a president of the Weizmann Institute of Science, from 1975 to 1985. He died in Rehovot on 27 May 2022 at the age of 98.

== Research ==
Sela is known for his research in immunology, particularly for research on synthetic antigens, molecules that trigger the immune system to attack. This work of Sela has led to the discovery of the genetic control of the immune response, as well as to the design of vaccines based on synthetic molecules.

He was among the first who introduced the use of linear and branched synthetic polypeptides as antigens, and this brought about a better understanding of immunological phenomena.

For several decades, Sela was interested in the possibility of fighting the autoimmune disease, experimental allergic encephalomyelitis with synthetic analogs of the molecules in the myelin sheath of the brain which are capable of provoking the disease.

He is probably best known as the co-developer (with Ruth Arnon and Dvora Teitelbaum) of the multiple sclerosis drug copaxone.

== Awards and honours ==
Sela received numerous major national and international awards:

- The Israel Prize in Life Sciences (1959)
- Germany's Otto Warburg Medal (1968)
- The Rothschild Prize (1967)
- Member of the American Academy of Arts and Sciences (1971)
- Germany's Emil von Behring Prize (1972)
- Member of the National Academy of Sciences of the United States (1976)
- Canada's Gairdner Foundation International Award (1980)
- France's Institut de la Vie Prize (1984)
- Germany's Commander's Cross of the Order of Merit Award (1986)
- France's Officier de l'Ordre de la Légion d'honneur (1987)
- Member (Hon. causa) of The Romanian Academy (Academia Română) (1991)
- UNESCO's Albert Einstein Golden Medal (1995)
- Member of the American Philosophical Society (1995)
- Interbrew-Baillet Latour Health Prize of Belgium (1997)
- The Wolf Prize in Medicine (1998), along with Ruth Arnon, for "their major discoveries in the field of immunology".

== See also ==
- List of Israel Prize recipients
