= Rodolfo Bonifacio =

Italian physicist

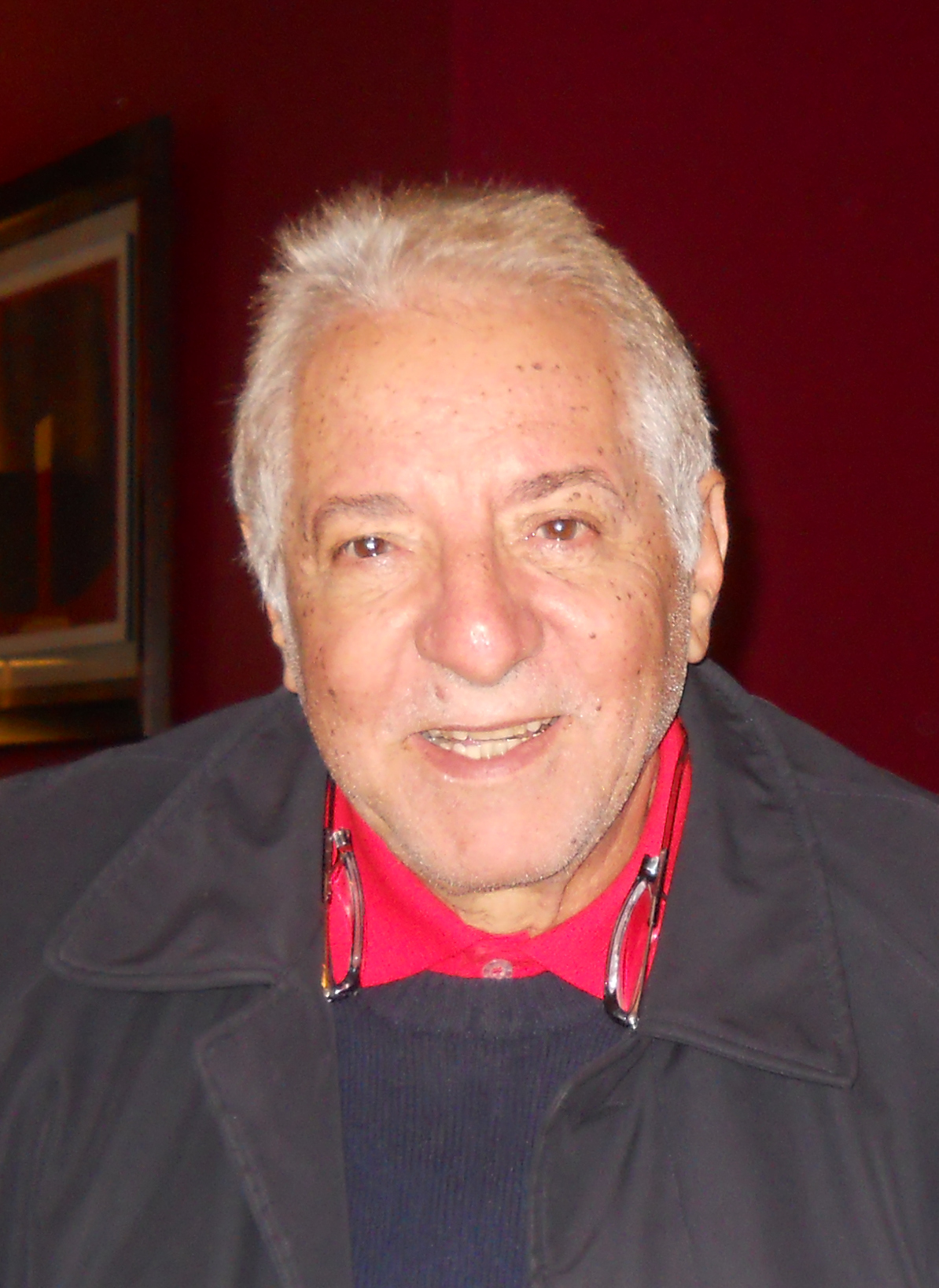
Rodolfo Bonifacio at INFN, Frascati, June 2012

Rodolfo Bonifacio (Messina, 24 February 1940 – Rome, 1 November 2016) was an Italian physicist, Professor Emeritus at University of Milan, who made significant contributions to laser physics and quantum optics.

== Education and career ==
Bonifacio studied in Milan, graduating with Piero Caldirola in 1964. He was a postdoctoral student at Harvard University with Roy Glauber. Afterwards he was a professor in Milan. He was also in the Milan section of the Istituto Nazionale di Fisica Nucleare (INFN).

He has been a visiting professor and visiting scientist at Lawrence Berkeley National Laboratory, Stanford Linear Accelerator Center, and Brookhaven National Laboratory.

== Research ==
As part of their investigation of the nonlinear interaction of an electromagnetic pulse with an ensemble of two-level atoms, he and Tito Arecchi independently derived the equations known as Maxwell-Bloch equations. In 1970, with Paolo Schwendimann and Fritz Haake, he developed a classical and quantum theory of cooperative spontaneous emission and coined the name superfluorescence. With Luigi Lugiato he later described oscillating superfluorescence, which was confirmed experimentally. In addition, with Lugiato he developed a molecular field theory of optical bistability with a description of photon statistics and they developed an exact theory of optical bistability in a ring resonator with later experimentally confirmed prediction of optical self-pulsing.

In 1982 he described a model of the free electron laser (FEL) with Federico Casagrande and Giulio Casati. They predicted a first-order phase transition to laser operation for critical values of the magnetic wiggler field and electron density.

In the 1990s he studied the interaction of cold atomic gases with light and developed the theory of the Collective Atomic Recoil Laser (CARL, 1994), in which both internal atomic states and the movement of atoms play a role (so that he experiences both the theory of conventional lasers and FEL). This has been observed as superradiant Rayleigh scattering (SRyS) in both ordinary cold atomic gases and Bose-Einstein condensate (BEC). The latter suggested an extension of the CARL model, which also included the atomic recoil during photon emission, which led Bonifacio to investigate a possible new regime of FEL called Quantum FEL (QFEL) in the 2000s, building on the work of Giuliano Preparata at the end of the 2000s 1980s. He saw this as a possible compact source for coherent gamma radiation.

He also dealt with the nature and quantization of time.

In 1987 he received the Albert A. Michelson Medal from the Franklin Institute with Luigi A. Lugiato and in 1994 the Einstein Medal from the Society for Quantum Optics and Quantum Electronics.

An article published in Nature in 2015 with the title Due credit for Maxwell–Bloch equations authored by Brian McNeil suggests that "These coupled equations were not actually derived by Maxwell and Bloch, but instead can be traced back to a little cited (given its significance) publication by Tito Arecchi and Rodolfo Bonifacio".
