= Enrico Fermi Prize =

The Enrico Fermi Prize, first awarded in 2001, is given by the Italian Physical Society (Società Italiana di Fisica). It is a yearly award of €30,000 honoring one or more Members of the Society who have "particularly honoured physics with their discoveries."

== Recipients ==
Year	Winner	Recognition
2018	Federico Capasso	"for seminal contributions to the physics of electronic and optical materials and their applications, ranging from the invention of the quantum cascade laser to the design of novel semiconductor materials, including metasurfaces"
2018	Lev Pitaevskii	"for his longstanding contribution to theoretical physics, including the study of superfluidity in liquid helium and of Van der Waals-Casimir forces, as well as for the development of the" Gross-Pitaevskii "theory which is a fundamental block of the physics of quantum gases"
2018	Erio Tosatti	"for fundamental theoretical contributions aimed to understand the optical properties of solids, in particular of surface and transport phenomena, even in extreme conditions of dimensional confinement, high temperature and pressure"
2017	Gianpaolo Bellini	"for the measurement of the solar neutrino spectrum, providing the evidence for nuclear hydrogen fusion in the sun and for adiabatic neutrino flavour conversion in matter"
2017	Veniamin Berezinsky	"for his theoretical contributions to the cosmogenic production of ultra-high energy neutrinos, to high energy neutrino astronomy and to the solar neutrino problem"
2017	Till Kirsten	"for the first observation of low energy solar electron neutrinos providing the first direct evidence of hydrogen fusion inside a star"
2016	Barry Barish	"for his fundamental contributions to the formation of the scientific collaborations" LIGO "and" LIGO-Virgo "and for his role in addressing various technological and scientific challenges whose solution led to the first detection of gravitational waves"
2016	Adalberto Giazotto	"for his decisive contributions in conceiving and realising the first interferometer with super-attenuators," Virgo, "which made possible the quest for gravitational wave sources with an unprecedented sensitivity at low frequency"
2015	Toshiki Tajima	"for the invention of the laser-wakefield-acceleration technique which led to a large number of fundamental and interdisciplinary applications ranging from accelerator science to plasma physics and astrophysics"
2015	Diederik Wiersma	"for the first observation of Anderson localisation and of anomalous transport phenomena described by Lévy statistics in the framework of his highly original research on light propagation in disordered media"
2014	Federico Faggin	"for the invention of the MOS silicon gate technology that led him to the realization in 1971 of the first modern microprocessor"
2013	Pierluigi Campana	"for the outstanding results that the five large international collaboration experiments at the" CERN LHC "collider –" LHCb, TOTEM, ATLAS, ALICE, CMS "– have achieved during the first period of" LHC "data taking under the successful guidance of the awardees as spokespersons"
2013	Simone Giani	"for the outstanding results that the five large international collaboration experiments at the" CERN LHC "collider –" LHCb, TOTEM, ATLAS, ALICE, CMS "– have achieved during the first period of" LHC "data taking under the successful guidance of the awardees as spokespersons"
2013	Fabiola Gianotti	"for the outstanding results that the five large international collaboration experiments at the" CERN LHC "collider –" LHCb, TOTEM, ATLAS, ALICE, CMS "– have achieved during the first period of" LHC "data taking under the successful guidance of the awardees as spokespersons"
2013	Paolo Giubellino	"for the outstanding results that the five large international collaboration experiments at the" CERN LHC "collider –" LHCb, TOTEM, ATLAS, ALICE, CMS "– have achieved during the first period of" LHC "data taking under the successful guidance of the awardees as spokespersons"
2013	Guido Tonelli	"for the outstanding results that the five large international collaboration experiments at the" CERN LHC "collider –" LHCb, TOTEM, ATLAS, ALICE, CMS "– have achieved during the first period of" LHC "data taking under the successful guidance of the awardees as spokespersons"
2012	Roberto Car	"for the discovery of a molecular dynamics method known the world over as the" Car-Parrinello "method. This method has been a breakthrough in the field of numerical simulations, with great impact in many interdisciplinary contexts both theoretical and experimental, ranging from material science to chemistry and biology"
2012	Michele Parrinello	"for the discovery of a molecular dynamics method known the world over as the" Car-Parrinello "method. This method has been a breakthrough in the field of numerical simulations, with great impact in many interdisciplinary contexts both theoretical and experimental, ranging from material science to chemistry and biology"
2011	Dieter Haidt	"for their fundamental contribution to the discovery of the weak neutral currents with the" Gargamelle "bubble chamber at" CERN
2011	Antonino Pullia	"for their fundamental contribution to the discovery of the weak neutral currents with the" Gargamelle "bubble chamber at" CERN
2010	Enrico Costa	"for the discovery of the X-ray afterglow of gamma-ray burst with the" BeppoSAX "satellite"
2010	Filippo Frontera	"for the discovery of the X-ray afterglow of gamma-ray burst with the" BeppoSAX "satellite"
2010	Francesco Iachello	"for his contribution to the theory of atomic nuclei and, in particular, for the discovery of a rich variety of dynamical symmetries and supersymmetries"
2009	Dimitri Nanopoulos	"for the discovery of fundamental phenomenological properties of grand unification and superstring theories"
2009	Miguel Ángel Virasoro	"for the discovery of an infinite-dimensional algebra of primary importance for the construction of string theories"
2008	Giulio Casati	"for his understanding of the relationship between classical and quantum chaos also in relation to quantum computing"
2008	Luigi Lugiato	"for the discovery of instability-driven structures in non linear light-matter interactions"
2008	Luciano Pietronero	"for demonstrating the onset of fractal shapes in a variety of self-organizing phenomena"
2007	Milla Baldo-Ceolin	"for her outstanding works on K-meson and neutrino physics"
2007	Ettore Fiorini	"for his contribution to the discovery of weak neutral currents and to the study of solar neutrinos"
2007	Italo Mannelli	"for the demonstration of direct" CP "symmetry breaking in the K-meson decay"
2006	Giorgio Careri	"for the discovery of quantum vortices in superfluid helium"
2006	Tito Arecchi	"for the first experimental demonstration of the statistical properties of coherent radiation"
2005	Sergio Ferrara	"for his contribution to the discovery of the theory of supergravity"
2005	Gabriele Veneziano	"for his discovery of dual models, subsequently acknowledged as the theoretical basis for a string theory of quantum gravity""
2005	Bruno Zumino	"for his contributions to supersymmetry and supergravity theories"
2004	Massimo Inguscio	"for his contributions to the study of atomic Bose-Einstein condensates, in particular for the realization of degenerate quantum mixtures of bosons and fermions, and the invention of new experimental techniques that allowed him to obtain the first Bose-Einstein condensation of ^{41}K atoms"
2003	Nicola Cabibbo	"for his theory of down- and strange-quark mixing in weak decays, in which the well-known parameter called" "Cabibbo angle" "plays a key role"
2003	Raoul Gatto	"for his pioneering works in the field of strange-particle weak decays and for his role of leader in this fundamental field of subnuclear physics"
2003	Luciano Maiani	"for having introduced, together with S. Glashow and J. Iliopoulos, the so-called" GIM "mechanism which, predicting the existence of the fourth quark, allowed to solve the problem of flavour-changing neutral currents"
2002	Giorgio Parisi	"for his contributions to field theory and statistical mechanics, and in particular for his fundamental results concerning the statistical properties of disordered systems"
2001	Antonino Zichichi	"for his discovery of the first example of nuclear antimatter (the antideuteron) and for his works that paved the way to the discovery of the charged heavy lepton"

== See also ==
- List of physics awards
