= Optical properties =

How a material interacts with light

The optical properties of a material define how it interacts with light. The optical properties of matter are studied in optical physics (a subfield of optics) and applied in materials science. The optical properties of matter include:

- Refractive index
- Dispersion
- Transmittance and Transmission coefficient
- Absorption
- Scattering
- Turbidity
- Reflectance and Reflectivity (reflection coefficient)
- Albedo
- Perceived color
- Fluorescence
- Phosphorescence
- Photoluminescence
- Optical bistability
- Dichroism
- Birefringence
- Optical activity
- Photosensitivity

A basic distinction is between isotropic materials, which exhibit the same properties regardless of the direction of the light, and anisotropic ones, which exhibit different properties when light passes through them in different directions.

The optical properties of matter can lead to a variety of interesting optical phenomena.

== Properties of specific materials ==
- Optical properties of water and ice
- Optical properties of carbon nanotubes
- Crystal optics

== Literature ==
- Fox, Mark (2010). Optical properties of solids. Oxford New York: Oxford University Press. ISBN 978-0-19-957336-3.
- Papadopoulos, Manthos G.; Sadlej, Andrzej J.; Leszczynski, Jerzy, eds. (2006). Non-Linear Optical Properties of Matter. Challenges and Advances in Computational Chemistry and Physics. Vol. 1. Dordrecht: Springer Netherlands. doi:10.1007/1-4020-4850-5. ISBN 978-1-4020-4849-4.
