= Vinod Johri =

Indian astrophysicist (1935–2014)

Vinod Behari Johri
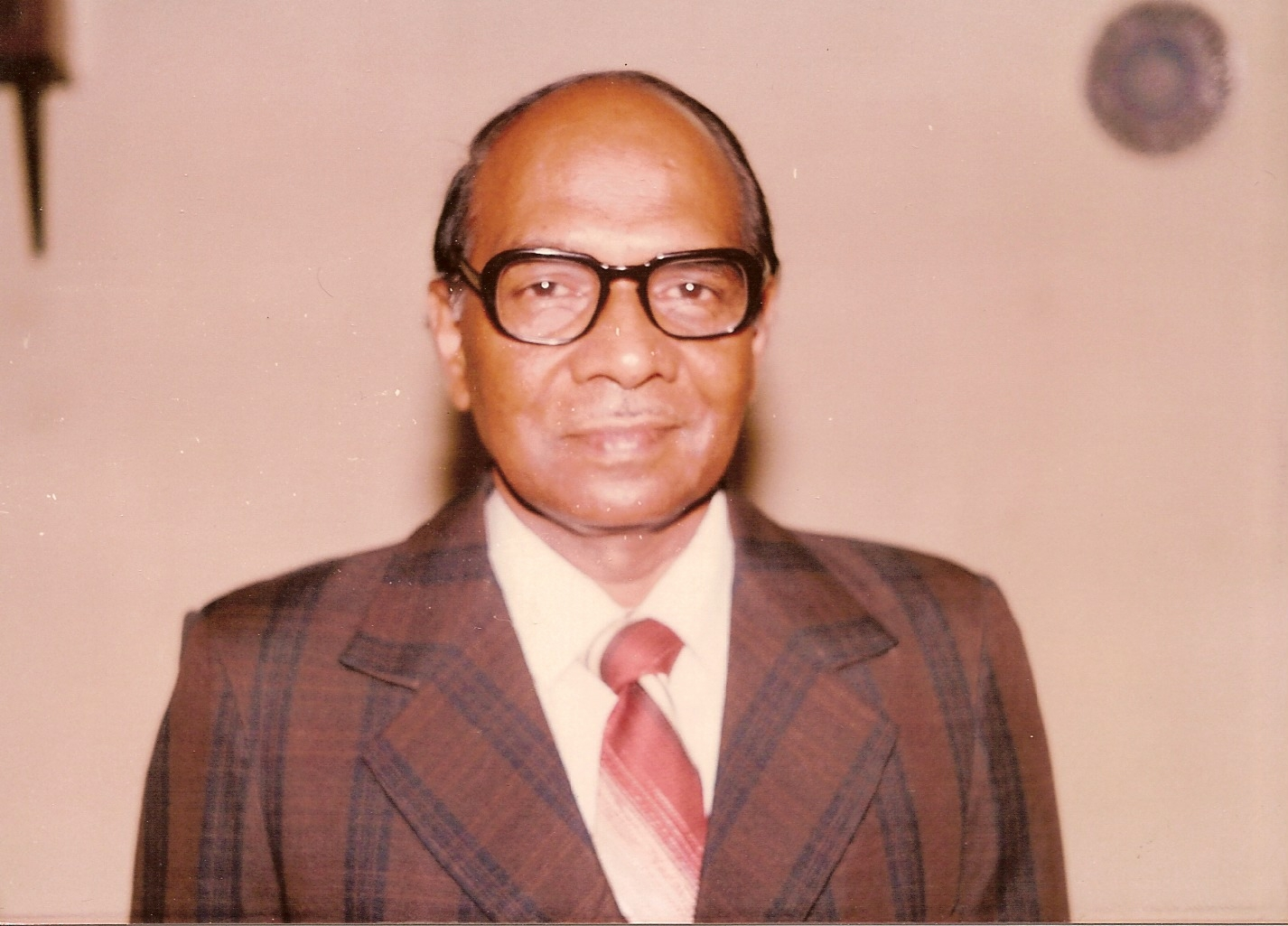
- Born: 10 June 1935; Etah, United Provinces, British India
- Died: 10 May 2014 (aged 78); Dallas, Texas, U.S.
- Education: Allahabad University; Gorakhpur University
- Known for: Power law inflation in Brans–Dicke theory Theory of integrated tracking of quintessence fields of dark energy Phantom cosmologies
- Scientific career
- Fields: Astrophysics, Physics, Cosmology
- Workplaces: Indian Institute of Technology; Lucknow University; Gorakhpur University; Allahabad University
- Doctoral advisor: K. B. Lal

Vinod Johri (10 June 1935 – 10 May 2014) was an Indian astrophysicist. He was an eminent cosmologist, a retired professor of astrophysics at Indian Institute of Technology, Madras and an emeritus professor at Lucknow University since 1995. Johri had over 75 research publications and articles published in pioneering journals. His major contributions in cosmological research included 'power law inflation, genesis of quintessence fields of dark energy and phantom cosmologies'. He was the co-author of the first model of power law inflation in Brans–Dicke theory along with C. Mathiazhagan. He was honored by Uttar Pradesh Government by Research Award of the Council of Science & Technology (CSIR).

Johri spent over 45 years researching in cosmology, acting as a research guide and principal investigator of various research projects of Council of Scientific and Industrial Research, Department of Science & Technology and University Grants Commission of India. Johri was a Commonwealth Fellow, a senior visitor at Cambridge University (UK) and a Fellow of Royal Astronomical Society of London. He worked as consultant for UNESCO at United Nations Development Program in Iran and as a DAAD Fellow at University of Mainz (Germany), as a visiting scientist at Hansen Lab (Gravity Probe B Group) Stanford University (USA) and as an International Scholar at Fine Theoretical Physics Institute at University of Minnesota at Minneapolis (USA). He died in Dallas, USA at the age of 78 due to complications arising from Kidney failure.

== Career ==
Johri was born in Etah (Uttar Pradesh), India, on 10 June 1935. His father, Bhairon Prasad Johri, graduated from Veterinary College, Patna, and worked as livestock officer, Allahabad, India. Johri's mother, Sarojini Johri, was a homemaker.

Johri completed his high school at Narain College, Shikohabad, India, with 12th rank in the state merit list. He was awarded First Prize in Chiranjeevi Dhiri Singh Provincial English Debate. He completed his bachelor's degree in 1953 and master's in applied mathematics in 1956 from Allahabad University scoring high ranks in the merit list. In 1957 he was appointed as assistant professor in the Department of Mathematics Allahabad University, Allahabad. In 1960, Johri was appointed assistant professor in mathematics at Gorakhpur University, Gorakhpur India, where he was conferred PhD degree in 1966 on his thesis "Gravitational Waves in Bondi Space-Time".

In 1967 Johri was awarded Commonwealth Fellowship for Post-Doctorate work at Department of Mathematics and Theoretical Physics, Cambridge University (UK), where he worked in close collaboration on cosmological problems with Dr.Dennis Sciama and research scholars Friedrich Hehl (Cologne), Fernando de Felice (Padova, Italy), George Ellis (Cape Town) and Stephen Hawking (UK) for his postdoctoral program. In 1968 Johri was appointed reader in mathematics at Gorakhpur University. Between 1970 and 1972, Johri worked as UNESCO consultant to Government of Iran under United Nations Development Program at Tehran. Johri was elected a Fellow of Royal Astronomical Society of London in 1978.

Johri accepted the position of professor of cosmology at the Mathematics Department of Indian Institute of Technology, Madras (Chennai) in 1980. In addition to teaching and advising PhD students, he introduced new courses on general relativity and cosmology. In 1984, he discovered the first model of 'power law inflation' under Brans–Dicke theory (later on called as 'extended inflation') along with his student C.Mathizhagan. Johri worked on various visiting assignments at National University (Kuwait), International Centre for Theoretical Physics, Trieste (Italy), Copernicus Astronomical Institute, Polish Academy of Sciences (Warsaw), National University of Singapore, South West Technical University of Sydney; Australian National University, Canberra, Hansen Lab (Gravity Probe B Group), Stanford University, Cologne University, International Institute of Physics and Chemistry Brussels University (hosted by Nobel Laureate Prof. Ilya Prigogine).

In 1995 Johri retired from Indian Institute of Technology and joined as CSIR Professor Emeritus in the Department of Mathematics & Astronomy at Lucknow University, Lucknow (India). In 2001, Johri got interested in dark energy during his visiting assignment at Fine Theoretical Physics Institute, University of Minnesota (USA), he gave the theory of 'integrated tracking' of Quintessence Fields. His research work on 'Genesis of Quintessence' and 'Phantom Cosmologies' was published in reputed journals Physical Review D & Classical and Quantum Gravity.

== Honors ==
Johri was a Commonwealth Fellow and a senior visitor to Cambridge University (UK). He was also a resident of Clare College, Cambridge. He was elected a Fellow of Royal Astronomical Society of London in 1978. Johri was awarded the Royal Society Visiting Fellowship in 1989 for visiting Department of Applied Mathematics and Theoretical Physics (DAMTP) Cambridge, Southampton University (UK), Cardiff University and Queen Mary College, London under the Distinguished Scientists Exchange Program of British Council. In 1993, Johri was awarded DAAD Fellowship for his visiting assignment at Theoretical Physics Institute, Johannes Gutenberg University, Mainz(Germany).

Johri was honored with a 'Silver Plaque' by Council of Science & Technology, India for his distinguished work on Dark Energy in the year 2006. He was Life Member of Ganita Parishad and a founding member of the Indian Association of General Relativity and Gravitation.

== Writings and hobbies ==
Besides scientific research papers and popular science articles, Johri wrote several books on Mathematical Physics and Astrophysics. His research monograph Early Universe was published by Hadronic Press (USA) in 1996. Vinod Johri loved to compose verses in Hindi, Urdu and English during his leisure time.

== Personal life ==
Johri was married to Aruna (maiden name Kodesia) for 54 years. The couple had 2 sons Manoj (Software Architect, HP), Vivek (IT Manager, UnitedHealth Group) and 2 daughters Manisha (Teacher at Shishya, Chennai) and Anvita (Software Development, UnitedHealth Group). Johri died on 10 May 2014, at the age of 78.
