= LLE (disambiguation) =

The Laboratory for Laser Energetics is a scientific research facility in the United States.

LLE may also refer to:

- Liquid–liquid extraction as a chemical separation method.
- Llanelli railway station, Carmarthenshire, Wales (National Rail station code)
- Locally linear embedding.
- Low-Level Emulation
- Lugiato–Lefever equation, a framework for the study of spontaneous pattern formation in nonlinear optical systems.
