= Luigi Lugiato =

Italian physicist (1944-)

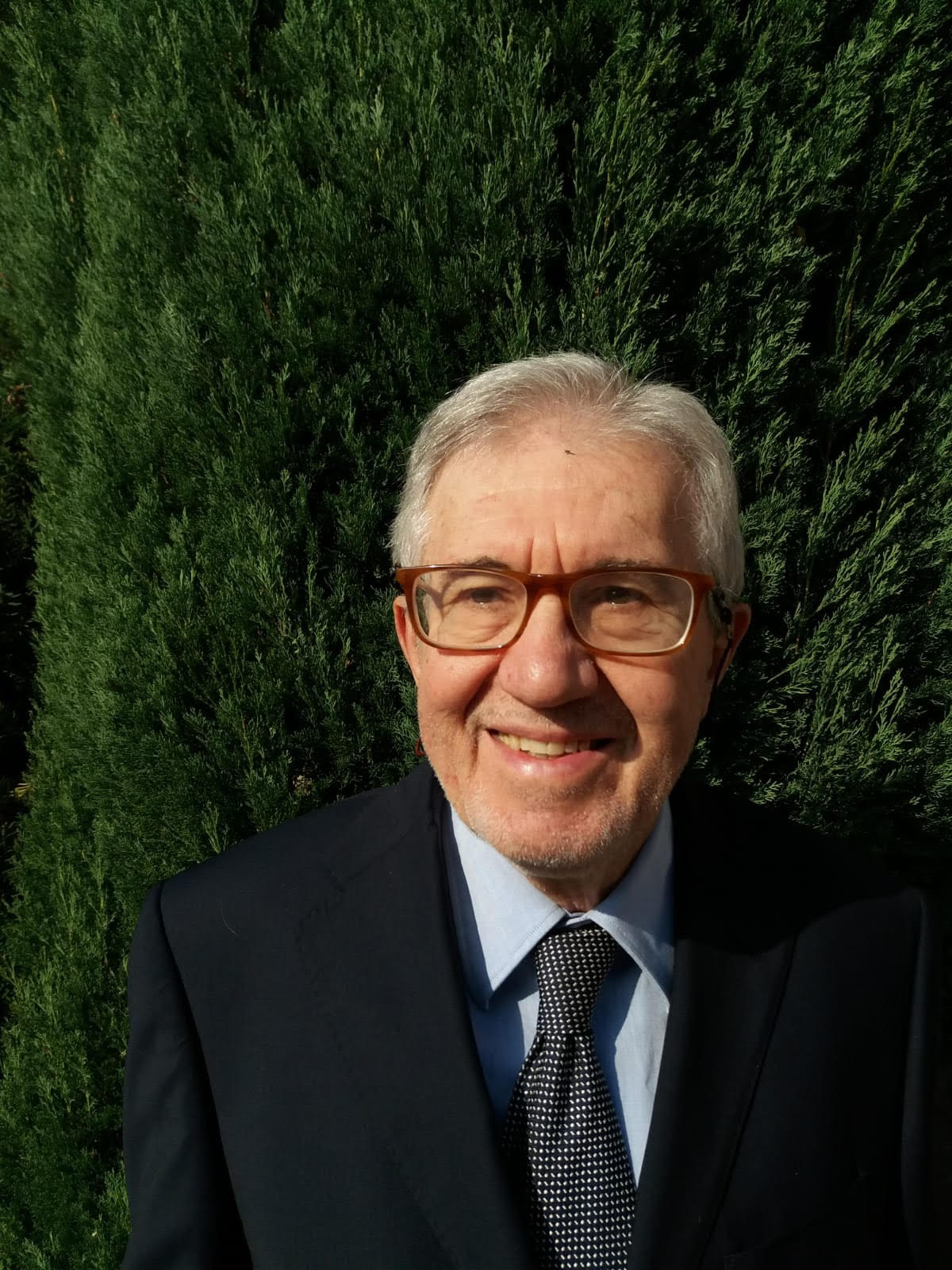
- Born: December 17, 1944 (age 81); Limbiate, Italy
- Education: University of Milan
- Known for: Lugiato–Lefever equation; Cavity solitons; Quantum Imaging
- Awards: Michelson Medal (1987); Willis Lamb Medal ( 2002); Quantum Electronics and Optics Prize (2003); Max Born Award (2007); Fermi Prize and Medal (2008)
- Scientific career
- Fields: Physics
- Workplaces: University of Milan; Turin Polytechnic; University of Insubria

Luigi Lugiato (born December 17, 1944) is an Italian physicist and professor emeritus at University of Insubria (Varese/Como). He is best known for his work in theoretical nonlinear and quantum optics, and especially for the Lugiato–Lefever equation (LLE,). He has authored more than 340 scientific articles, and the textbook Nonlinear Dynamical Systems (with F. Prati and M. Brambilla). His work has been theoretical but has stimulated a large number of important experiments in the world. It is also characterized by the fact of combining the classical and quantum aspects of optical systems.

== Education, career and research ==
Lugiato received his doctor of Physics degree, summa cum laude, from the University of Milan, Italy, on March 13, 1968. Later he became Research Fellow of Italian Ministry of Public Education and Researcher of Institute of Nuclear Physics at University of Milan. In 1974 he became assistant professor, and in 1980 he was promoted to associate professor in the same university. In 1987 he became full professor at Turin Polytechnic, in 1990 he moved to the University of Milan and in 1998 to University of Insubria in Como.

On the classical side, his researches mainly concerned the phenomena of bistability and instability that arise in nonlinear media contained in optical cavities, and the effects of spontaneous formation of temporal, spatial and spatio-temporal patterns generated by the instability. And he studied extensively also the generation and manipulation of cavity solitons by injection of writing/erasing address pulses in the resonator. Cavity solitons in the planes orthogonal to the direction of propagation of light have been experimentally observed in vertical cavity surface emitting semiconductor lasers by Stephane Barland, Jorge Tredicce et al and in other systems (see the reviews)

In this framework, most well known is the equation he introduced in 1987 together with Renè Lefever, as a paradigm for spontaneous pattern formation in optical systems. The patterns arise from the interaction of a coherent field, that is injected in the resonator, with a Kerr medium which fills the cavity. The same equation governs two kinds of patterns: stationary patterns that form in the planes orthogonal with respect to the direction of propagation of light and patterns that arise in the longitudinal direction of propagation, travel along the cavity with the velocity of light in the medium and give rise to a sequence of pulses in the output of the cavity. The scenario of longitudinal patterns described by the LLE constitutes a special case of the multimode instability of optical bistability previously discovered by Lugiato in collaboration with Rodolfo Bonifacio. The first theoretical prediction of cavity solitons in the LLE was given by Willie Firth, Andrew Scroggie, Mustapha Tlidi, René Lefever, Lugiato et al. The first experimental observation of cavity solitons in the longitudinal direction of propagation, in agreement with the LLE, was obtained in a fiber cavity by Francois Leo, Stephane Coen, Mark Haelterman et al.

The interest in the LLE increased even further around the end of the first decade of the new century, because it turned out that the longitudinal LLE describes very accurately the phenomenon of Kerr frequency combs (KFC) in microresonators, discovered in 2007 by Tobias Kippenberg and collaborators exploiting the whispering-gallery modes activated by a CW laser injected into a high-Q microresonator filled with a Kerr medium. KFC, sometimes associated with Kerr cavity solitons, have a bandwidth that can exceed an octave and repetition rates in the microwave to THz frequencies, which offers substantial potential for miniaturization and chip-scale photonic integration. This technology has been applied e.g. to coherent telecommunications, spectroscopy, atomic clocks as well as laser ranging and astrophysical spectrometer calibration. The rather idealized conditions assumed in the formulation of the LLE have been perfectly materialized by the spectacular technological progress in the field of photonics which has led, in particular, to the discovery of KFC.

An article of Lugiato with Claudio Oldano and Lorenzo Narducci generalized the LLE, formulated for a system without population inversion, to the case of a laser near threshold. This equation is tightly linked to very recent experimental observations of frequency combs in quantum cascade lasers near threshold by Marco Piccardo, Federico Capasso et al.

On the quantum side, Lugiato's researches have contributed profoundly to the study of non-classical states of the radiation field, in particular squeezing, focussing especially on the cases of optical bistability and second-harmonic generation. In the 1990s, his investigations focussed on the quantum aspects of optical patterns and on the spatial aspects of squeezing. These results contributed substantially to the birth of a novel field which has been called quantum imaging, and exploits the quantum nature of light to develop new techniques for imaging and for the elaboration of information in parallel configurations.

On the basis of a quantum formulation of the LLE, Lugiato was the first to predict squeezing in an optical pattern (today one would call it squeezing in KFC) . This effect has been recently demonstrated experimentally by Alexander Gaeta, Michal Lipson et al and called "squeezing on chip".

== Recognition ==
Lugiato is a member of the Italian Physical Society, of Academia Europaea, of Istituto Lombardo, Accademia di Scienze e Lettere, is a Fellow of the Optical Society of America, of the American Physical Society, of the European Physical Society, of the Franklin Institute. From 1980 to 1990 he was honorary adjunct professor at the Department of Physics and Atmospheric Sciences of Drexel University, Philadelphia.

He has received also numerous awards including the Albert A. Michelson Medal in 1987, the Willis E. Lamb Medal for Laser Science and Quantum Optics in 2002, the Quantum Optics and Electronics Prize of the European Physical Society in 2003, the 18th International Khwarizmi Prize in 2005, the Max Born Award of the Optical Society of America in 2007, the Fermi Prize and Medal of the Italian Physical Society in 2008 ], the International Prize Luigi Tartufari of Accademia Nazionale dei Lincei in 2010 . In 2019 he has received the Quantum Electronics Award of IEEE Photonics Society and a Doctorate in Science honoris causa from the University of Strathclyde in Glasgow.

== Life ==
His wife Vilma Tagliabue and himself have a son Paolo Lugiato, a General Manager who, married with Stefania Neri, has two children, Filippo and Valentina.
