= Astro-comb =

Type of frequency comb

An astro-comb is a type of frequency comb used in observational astronomy to increase the accuracy of wavelength calibration in spectrographs. The increased accuracy reduces systematic errors and enhances detection of small variations in stellar radial velocities caused by smaller orbiting exoplanets (e.g. Earth-mass planets), among other applications. Astro-combs are distinguished from conventional frequency combs by their focus on high repetition frequencies (with mode spacings of ≥10 GHz).

A green astro-comb was installed in January 2013 in the high accuracy radial velocity planet searcher in the Northern Hemisphere (HARPS-N) spectrograph at the Telescopio Nazionale Galileo on the Canary Islands. The device was developed by a team led by Chih-Hao Li of Harvard University. This astro-comb uses a pulsed laser to filter starlight before feeding the signal into a spectrograph. As of December 2016, it is gathering data from Venus to demonstrate its ability to discover exoplanets.

== See also ==
- Comb filter
