= Acín decomposition =

In a 2000 paper titled "Generalized Schmidt Decomposition and Classification of Three-Quantum-Bit States" Acín et al. described a way of separating out one of the terms of a general tripartite quantum state. This can be useful in considering measures of entanglement of quantum states.

== General decomposition ==
For a general three-qubit state $|\psi\rangle=a_{000}\left|0_{A}\right\rangle\left|0_{B}\right\rangle\left|0_{C}\right\rangle+a_{001}\left|0_{A}\right\rangle\left|0_{B}\right\rangle\left|1_{C}\right\rangle+a_{010}\left|0_{A}\right\rangle\left|1_{B}\right\rangle\left|0_{C}\right\rangle+a_{011}\left|0_{A}\right\rangle\left|1_{B}\right\rangle\left|1_{C}\right\rangle +a_{100}\left|1_{A}\right\rangle\left|0_{B}\right\rangle\left|0_{C}\right\rangle+a_{101}\left|1_{A}\right\rangle\left|0_{B}\right\rangle\left|1_{C}\right\rangle+a_{110}\left|1_{A}\right\rangle\left|1_{B}\right\rangle\left|0_{C}\right\rangle+a_{111}\left|1_{A}\right\rangle\left|1_{B}\right\rangle\left|1_{C}\right\rangle$there is no way of writing

$\left|\psi_{A, B, C}\right\rangle \neq \sqrt{\lambda_{0}}\left|0_{A}^{\prime}\right\rangle\left|0_{B}^{\prime}\right\rangle\left|0_{C}^{\prime}\right\rangle+\sqrt{\lambda_{1}}\left|1_{A}^{\prime}\right\rangle\left|1_{B}^{\prime}\right\rangle\left|1_{C}^{\prime}\right\rangle$

but there is a general transformation to $|\psi\rangle = \lambda_{1} |0_{A}^{}\rangle|0_{B}^{}\rangle|0_{C}^{}\rangle+|1_{A}^{}\rangle(\lambda_{2} e^{i \phi}|0_{B}^{}\rangle|0_{C}^{}\rangle+\lambda_{3}|0_{B}^{}\rangle|1_{C}^{}\rangle+\lambda_{4}|1_{B}^{}\rangle|0_{C}^{}\rangle+\lambda_{5}|1_{B}^{}\rangle|1_{C}^{}\rangle)$where $\lambda_{i} \geq 0, \sum_{i=1}^{5} \lambda_{i}^{2}=1$.
