= Dieter Haidt =

German physicist

Dieter Haidt (born 1940) is a German physicist, known for his contribution to the 1973 discovery of weak neutral currents. The discovery was made in the Gargamelle experiment, which used a heavy liquid bubble chamber detector in operation at CERN from 1970 to 1979.

== Education and career ==
In 1958 Haidt graduated from the Kepler-Gymnasium in Tübingen. He then studied physics at the University of Tübingen, where he graduated with a Diplom in experimental physics in 1965. He then moved to RWTH Aachen University, where he was a member of the X2 collaboration. He was also a visiting scholar at University College London in 1966. In 1969 he received his doctorate at RWTH Aachen University summa cum laude and in 1970 he received the Borchers Medal. From 1970 he was a member of the Gargamelle collaboration at CERN (from RWTH Aachen University) and from 1971 to 1978 he was employed at CERN. In 1973, the Gargamelle collaboration discovered weak neutral currents. The collaboration searched for weak neutral currents in neutrino reactions without muon generation. The discovery's rapid recognition depended, to a considerable extent, on calculations by Haidt, who showed that the existence of weak neutral currents was a new type of effect (and not, e.g., interactions between neutrons). Other prominent physicists involved in the Gargamelle experiment include Antonino Pullia (1935–2020), Helmut Faissner (1928–2007), and André Lagarrigue (1924–1975).

Haidt was a spokesperson for the neutrino-propane experiment at the Gargamelle bubble chamber. He was involved in neutrino experiments at the BEBC detector. From 1979 to 2004 he was a senior scientist at DESY. From 1979 to 1986 he was a member of the JADE collaboration at DESY and from 1994 of the H1 collaboration. He was a member of the Physics Research Committee (PRC) at DESY and organized the DESY seminars. In 2007 he received emeritus status.

For the academic year 1987–1988 he was a visiting scientist at Japanese particle physics laboratory known as KEK.

In 2011 he shared the Enrico Fermi Prize with Antonino Pullia. In 2009, the Gargamelle collaboration received the European Physical Society's High-Energy and Particle Physics Prize.

From 1986 to 1997 he was an editor for the Zeitschrift für Physik C and from 1997 to 2006 he was the editor-in-chief of its successor, the European Physical Journal C.
