= Guido Tonelli =

Italian particle physicist

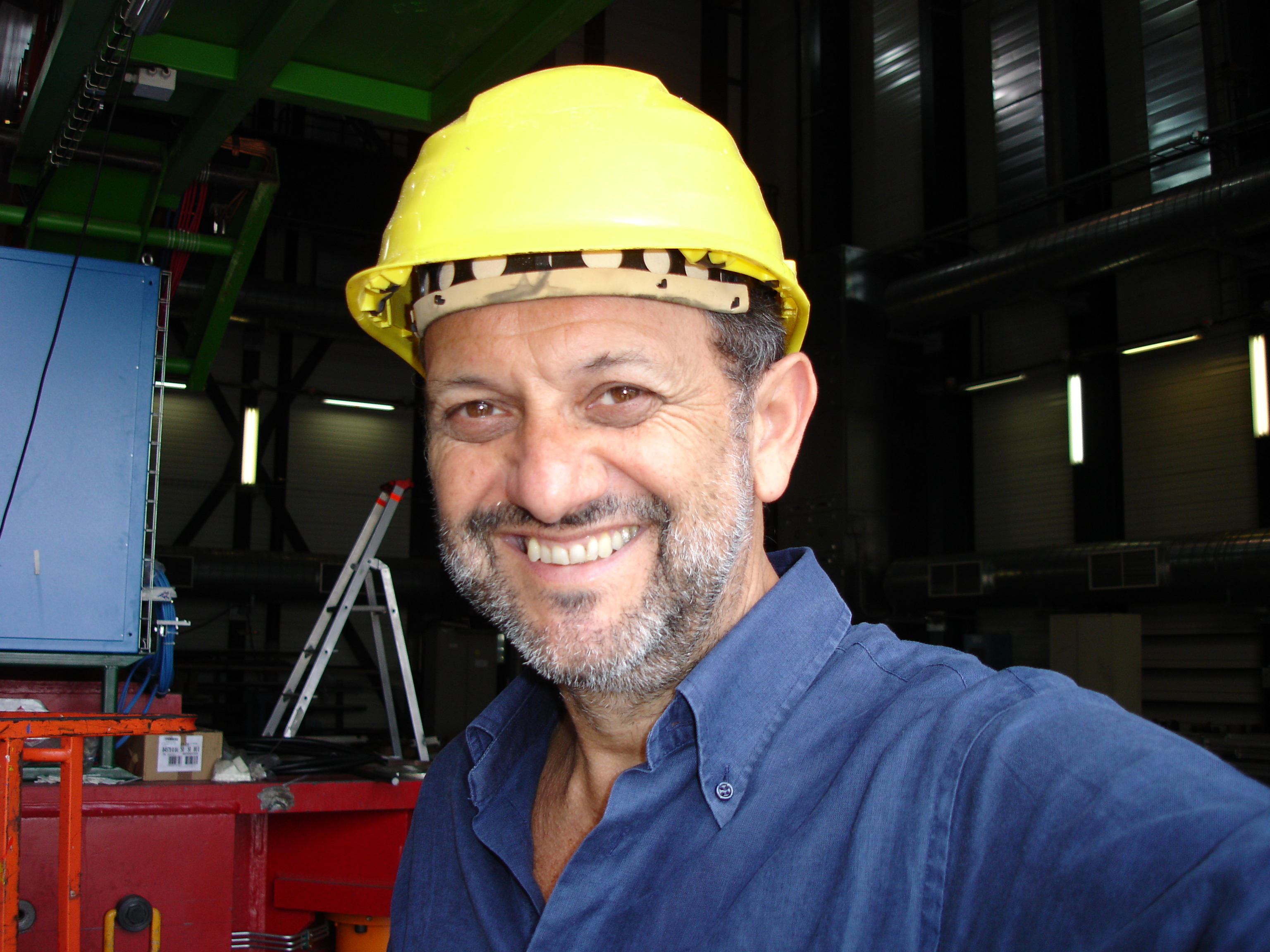
- Guido Tonelli in front of the CMS experiment at CERN
- Born: 1950 (age 75–76); Casola in Lunigiana
- Education: University of Pisa
- Known for: Higgs boson
- Awards: Breakthrough Prize in Fundamental Physics, Enrico Fermi Prize
- Scientific career
- Fields: Particle physics
- Workplaces: CERN, Fermilab
- Thesis: (1975)

Guido Tonelli (born 1950) is an Italian particle physicist who was involved with the discovery of the Higgs boson at the Large Hadron Collider. He is a professor of General Physics at the University of Pisa (Italy) and a CERN visiting scientist.

== Biography ==
He was born in Casola in Lunigiana, Italy, on 8 November 1950. He received his high school diploma in 1969 at the liceo classico Lorenzo Costa of La Spezia with a vote of 60/60. Subsequently, he received his degree in physics in 1975 at the University of Pisa (with a vote of 110/110), Italy where he became professor in 1992. Since 1976, he works in the field of high energy physics, participating in CERN experiments NA1, NA7 and ALEPH, and in the CDF experiment at Fermilab, Batavia (IL-USA). Among his contributions there are the first precision measurements of the lifetime of charmed mesons, precision tests of the Standard Model of the fundamental interactions, search for the Higgs boson, and for various signatures of Supersymmetry or new physics beyond the Standard Model.

Since the beginning of the '90 his activity is mainly devoted to the Compact Muon Solenoid (CMS), experiment proposed for the Large Hadron Collider (LHC) at CERN, Geneva, (Switzerland). He participates in CMS since the conceptual design contributing with the original idea of a central tracker fully based on semiconductor devices. He is elected as CMS Spokesperson for the years 2010-2011.

On 13 December 2011 together with Fabiola Gianotti, ATLAS Spokesperson, he presented in a special seminar at CERN the first evidence of the presence of the Higgs boson around a mass of 125 GeV/c^{2}. The 125GeV signal appears again in the new data collected in spring 2012, and, combining the 7 TeV 2011 data with the 8TeV, 2012 data, the statistical significance of the signal reaches the conventional 5 sigma threshold needed to announce a new discovery. Therefore, on 4 July 2012, the ATLAS and CMS experiments announce formally the observation of a new Higgs-like boson at LHC.

On 14 March 2013 new results presented by ATLAS and CMS at the Moriond Conference in La Thuile confirm that all observations are consistent with the hypothesis the observed particle being the Standard Model Higgs boson.

Thanks to this discovery, on 8 October 2013 the Nobel Prize in Physics 2013 was assigned to François Englert and Peter Higgs with the motivation "for the theoretical discovery of a mechanism that contributes to our understanding of the origin of mass of subatomic particles, and which recently was confirmed through the discovery of the predicted fundamental particle, by the ATLAS and CMS experiments at CERN's Large Hadron Collider".

== Awards ==
- On 24 October 2012 Giorgio Napolitano, President of the Italian Republic, awarded him the honour of Commendatore of the Order of Merit of the Italian Republic for his contribution to the discovery of a new, Higgs-like particle at the LHC.
- On 11 December 2012 he was awarded the 2012 Special Fundamental Physics Prize "for his leadership role in the endeavour that led to the discovery of the new Higgs-like particle by the ATLAS and CMS collaborations at the LHC".
- On 23 July 2013 he was awarded the 2013 Enrico Fermi Prize of the Italian Physics Society. The Society awarded the prize "to Guido Tonelli for the discovery, with the CMS experiment, of a new fundamental particle with mass around 125 GeV and properties consistent with a Higgs boson, theoretically predicted almost 50 years ago, the existence of which ensures a huge insight in the understanding of the Standard Model of particle physics".
- In 2013 he was awarded the Special Breakthrough Prize in Fundamental Physics for his role in the discovery of the new Higgs-like particle.
- In 2014, he has received the highest honors of the City of Pisa within the "Celebrations for the 450 Years from the birth of Galileo Galilei". On 11 March 2014 he was awarded the Silver Tower and on 24 October 2014, the Medal of Honor of the President of the Republic, Giorgio Napolitano. According to the motivations the prizes were awarded " to Guido Tonelli, key protagonist of the discovery of the Higgs boson, that led the 2013 Nobel Prize in physics to Francois Englert and Peter Higgs. Guido Tonelli, CERN scientist and Professor of the University of Pisa, is the last example of a tradition of excellence that started with Galileo Galilei and proceeded with Enrico Fermi, Bruno Pontecorvo and Carlo Rubbia".

== Publications ==
- 2021 Genesis: The Story of How Everything Began. New York: Farrar, Straus and Giroux. ISBN 978-0374600488
- 2025 Matter: The Magnificent Illusion. Cambridge: Polity Press. ISBN 978-1-509-56415-6
