= Milla Baldo-Ceolin =

Italian physicist

Massimilla "Milla" Baldo Ceolin
- Born: Massimilla Baldo-Ceolin; 12 August 1924; Legnago, Italy
- Died: 25 November 2011 (aged 87)
- Education: University of Padua
- Occupation: Particle Physicist
- Awards: Feltrinelli Prize; Enrico Fermi Prize

Massimilla "Milla" Baldo Ceolin (12 August 1924, Legnago, Italy – 25 November 2011) was an Italian particle physicist.

She was the daughter of the owner of a small mechanical workshop.

== Education and academic history ==
Milla Baldo Ceolin attended the Liceo Classico (classical high school) in Legnago, in the province of Verona, and obtained her high school diploma (maturità) in 1943. At the end of the Second World War, she enrolled in the physics degree program at the University of Padua, where she obtained her master's degree in 1952.

At the Physics Institute, Milla Baldo met Carlo Ceolin, a theoretical physicist, who accompanied her throughout her entire life. In 1953, Milla became Mrs. Baldo Ceolin.

Milla Baldo Ceolin obtained the chair of "Fisica Superiore" in 1963, the first woman to hold a chair at the University of Padua since its founding in 1222.

In Padua, from 1965 to 1968, she served as Head of the local section of the Istituto Nazionale di Fisica Nucleare (INFN), and from 1973 to 1978 as Head of the Physics Institute.

Since 1998, she has been Professor Emeritus at the University of Padua.

== Career and research ==
In the 1950s, her research focused on the study of cosmic ray interactions in nuclear emulsions, which were exposed at high-altitude mountain laboratories or carried by balloon experiments. This activity culminated in the G-stack experiment, a large international collaboration that provided the first indications of strange particles. According to her own words: "Research groups emerging from the catastrophe of the war had little more than their enthusiasm to contribute at the forefront of physics research, but by using the nuclear emulsion technique, they were able to disclose phenomena whose existence no one had suspected."

In 1958, she published the discovery of the anti-Lambda hyperon, by exposing nuclear emulsions to a proton beam produced at the Berkeley Bevatron. The discovery of the anti-Lambda (the first anti-hyperon ever observed) was highly significant: Milla Baldo Ceolin conceived the experiment, performed the feasibility calculations, and correctly interpreted the event observed in the photographic plates exposed at the Bevatron. This result provided the first evidence of antimatter carrying strangeness.

Her research then focused on charged and neutral K mesons, first using nuclear emulsions and subsequently with bubble chambers at the Lawrence Berkeley National Laboratory, at CERN, and at ITEP in Moscow. Her work produced important results on quantum numbers, selection rules, and fundamental invariances, including tests of CPT symmetry from the study of K⁰ meson decays in the Xenon bubble chamber at ITEP.

In the 1970s, she turned to neutrino physics. Soon after the discovery of weak neutral currents by the Gargamelle collaboration at CERN, she proposed the NUE experiment at CERN, to firmly confirm the discovery of neutral weak leptonic currents. The experiment used spark chambers to detect the elastic scattering of neutrinos and antineutrinos on electrons, providing evidence of neutral weak leptonic currents and determining a value for the Weinberg angle. She subsequently participated in a series of experiments at the BEBC bubble chamber at CERN, filled with deuterium, including PS180, which established one of the first experimental limits on neutrino oscillations.

Following the publications on Grand Unified Theories in the early 1980s, she began planning experiments to search for one of their original predictions: the possible existence of neutron-antineutron oscillations. She proposed, designed and realized a series of two experiments on free neutrons generated at the nuclear reactor of the Institut Laue-Langevin at Grenoble. The first experiment established the earliest experimental bound on the neutron-antineutron oscillation time, $\tau_{n\bar{n}} \geq 10^6$ s, while the second, with an upgraded setup, pushed the limit to $\tau_{n\bar{n}} \geq 0.84 \times 10^8$ s, the best experimental limit for free neutrons published to date.

Afterwards she led the italian contribution to the WA96/NOMAD (Neutrino Oscillation MAgnetic Detector) experiment, which aimed to search for $\nu_\mu-\nu_\tau$ oscillations using high-energy neutrinos (predominantly ν_{μ}) from the CERN SPS. The experiment was motivated by the anomaly in the measured flux of atmospheric neutrinos reported by KamiokaNDE and by theoretical speculations about the possibility that the heaviest neutrino could be the hot dark matter component. In the same years (1998), evidence for $\nu_\mu-\nu_\tau$ oscillations was reported by the Super-Kamiokande experiment, with oscillation parameters not accessible to the NOMAD experiment. Takaaki Kajita was awarded the Nobel Prize in Physics in 2015 for this discovery.

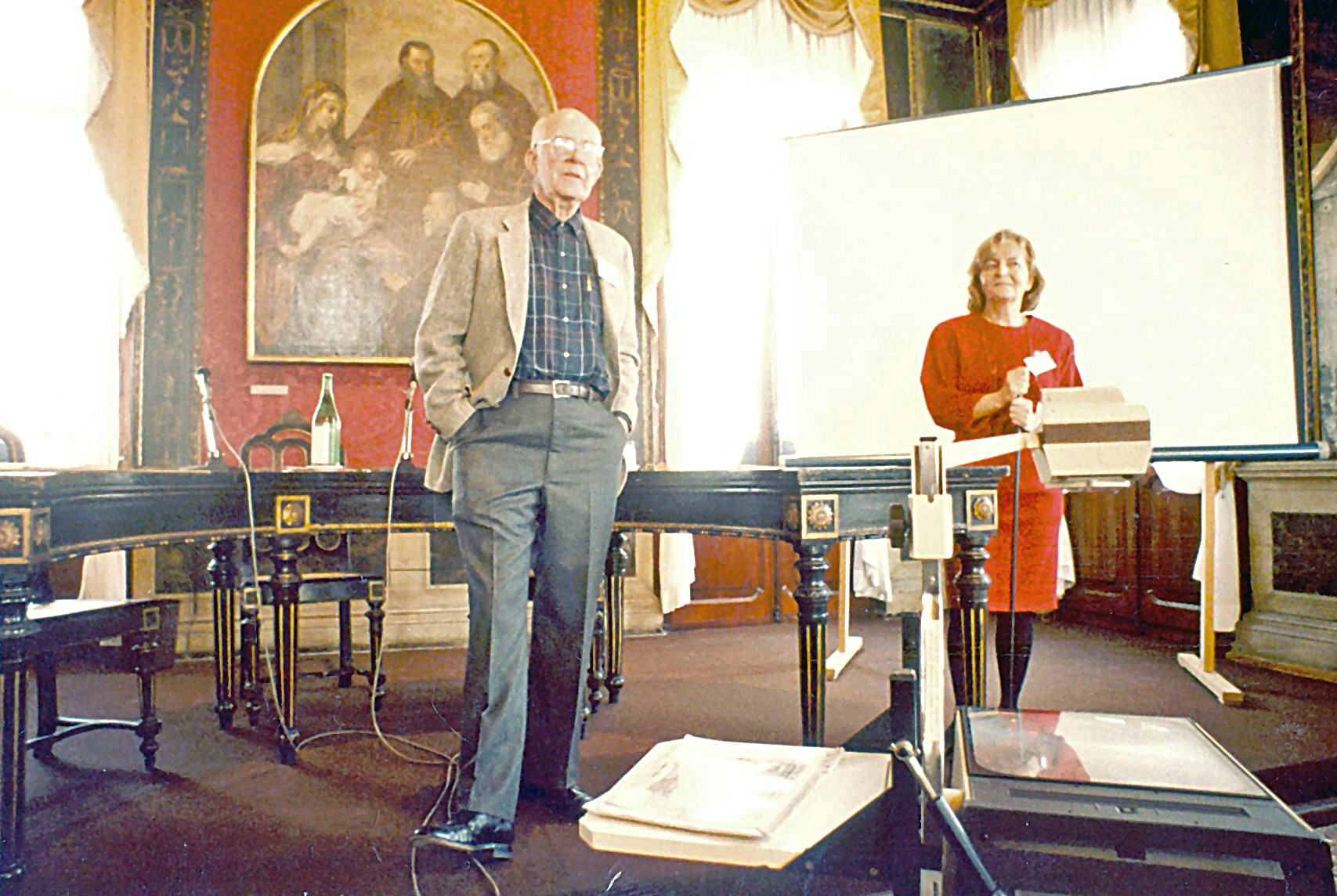
Milla Baldo Ceolin and Nobel laureate Ray Davis at the Neutrino Telescopes Workshop, Istituto Veneto di Scienze, Lettere ed Arti, Venice, 1990

Eventually, she joined the ICARUS experiment, a neutrino experiment at the Gran Sasso National Laboratories (LNGS). It used a Time Projection Chamber filled with liquid argon (LAr-TPC), a technology developed by Carlo Rubbia, containing about 600 tons of active argon mass. The experiment received the CNGS neutrino beam from CERN, 730 km away.

In 1988, she initiated the series of International Workshops on Neutrino Telescopes at the Istituto Veneto di Scienze, Lettere ed Arti.

== Awards ==
- Fellow of the Istituto Veneto di Scienze, Lettere ed Arti, (since 1977), of the Accademia Nazionale dei Lincei (since 1987); of the Accademia Galileiana di Padova (since 1966) and Accademia delle Scienze di Torino (since 2008).
- 1976: Awarded the Feltrinelli Prize by the Accademia dei Lincei.
- 1980: Gold Medal as "Benemeriti della Scuola, della Cultura e dell'Arte" by the Italian Ministero della Pubblica Istruzione.
- 1984: Award of Italian Physical Society (SIF), for working in the field of weak interactions and getting outstanding physical results, in occasion of the 50th Anniversary of Fermi's Theory.
- 1993: Gold Medal as "Benemeriti della Scienza e Cultura" by the Italian Ministero della Pubblica Istruzione.
- In 1995, she was included in the UCLA archive titled "Contributions of the 20th Century Women to Physics" (CWP), a digital project created to document the major scientific achievements of female physicists (86 entries).
- 2007: Enrico Fermi Prize of the Italian Physical Society "per gli importanti lavori sulla fisica dei mesoni K e sui neutrini".
- 2012: The Department of Physics and Astronomy of the University and the Padova Division of INFN (National Institute of Nuclear Science) organized a symposium in her honor.
- In 2015, a biography was published.
- In 2021, Istituto Nazionale di Fisica Nucleare established the "Milla Baldo Ceolin" National Award to the ten best master's theses in theoretical physics. The award aims to promote the visibility and growth of young female researchers in theoretical physics.
- 2021: The Department of Physics and Astronomy of the University of Padua and the INFN Section of Padua commemorated Milla Baldo Ceolin, whose studies and pioneering, visionary research opened new horizons for modern physics and for the understanding of the structure of the Universe.
- The "Milla Baldo Ceolin" nursery school opened in Padua in September 2021 with the support of the Cariparo Foundation.
- In 2023, the students of the junior high school in Roncà, in the province of Verona, celebrated the scientist from Legnago, Massimilla Baldo Ceolin, choosing that their school should bear the name of the woman who, 60 years before, was the first to obtain a professorship at the University of Padua.
