= Giulio Casati =

Italian physicist

- Professor Giulio Casati
- Born: December 9, 1942 (age 83)
- Education: Milan University
- Known for: Discovery and characterisation of quantum chaos, theory of classical non-linear lattices.
- Awards: Somaini (1991), Enrico Fermi (2008), Premio internazionale per la fisica della Accademia Nazionale dei Lincei (2010), Sigillo Longobardo (2010)
- Scientific career
- Fields: Theoretical Physics
- Workplaces: Milan University; University of Insubria
- Doctoral advisor: Piero Caldirola

Giulio Casati (born December 10, 1942) is Emeritus Professor of Theoretical Physics at University of Insubria. Casati is known for his work on chaos, both classical and quantum, being considered one of the pioneers of the latter. Casati is in fact principally known for the discovery of quantum dynamical localization phenomenon, that highlighted the relevance of chaos in quantum mechanics. His landmark paper, with Boris Chirikov, Joseph Ford and Felix Izrailev, is among the most quoted in the field. With Boris Chirikov, Italo Guarneri and Dima Shepelyansky Casati also discovered that quantum localization deeply affects the excitation of hydrogen atom in strong monochromatic fields. Further major contributions considered the connections between quantization of non integrable systems and the statistical theory of spectra. With the advent of quantum computing Casati and his coworkers studied the efficient quantum computing of complex dynamics. On the classical side, Casati's interests regarded mostly energy conduction in non-linear lattices: from the earliest numerical proof of the validity of Fourier law in one-dimensional many body systems, obtained in collaboration with Bill Wisscher, Franco Vivaldi, and Joseph Ford, to the description of a thermal rectifier and of a thermal transistor. The same techniques lead to the theoretical demonstration of a one-way mirror for light

Casati has received the Italian Prize for Physics "F. Somaini" (1991), the Enrico Fermi Prize (2008)(the most important Italian prize for Physics), the Premio internazionale per la fisica della Accademia Nazionale dei Lincei (2010), the Sigillo Longobardo (2010). He is a Member of the Academia Europaea and the European Academy of Sciences and Arts, and is the author/coauthor of over 300 publications.

Casati received his MS from the University of Milan in 1968, and from 1968 to 1971 was a Postdoctoral fellow at CCR Euratom – Ispra (Italy). In 1971-1972 he visited Georgia Institute of Technology as Research associate. He was then appointed Associate professor at the University of Milan 1973–1987, being appointed full professor of Theoretical Physics at the University of Milan in 1987. From 1993 to 1998 he also served as vice Dean of School of Science and Technology in the University of Milan. He then supervised the creation of a new university in Como, where he was Adjunct to the Rector from 1998 to 2001. Since 2002 he has also been on the faculty of the National University of Singapore. In 2014 he officially retired from the University of Insubria. Presently, he is also distinguished professor at the International Institute of Physics of the Federal University of Rio Grande do Norte, Brazil. Casati worked much to develop the scientific activities in his hometown of Como, where he founded the Centro di Cultura Scientifica Alessandro Volta, a world-renokwn Conference Center. He is presently the scientific director of the Lake Como School of Advanced Studies. He also founded the Center for Non-linear and Complex Systems at the University of Insubria, which he directed until 2014, when he was nominated honorary president

== Sources ==
- Center for Nonlinear and Complex Systems
