= Modulation transfer spectroscopy =

Spectroscopy technique

Modulation transfer spectroscopy (MTS) is a sub-Doppler spectroscopy technique commonly used for locking a laser to an atomic reference. MTS is a pump-probe spectroscopy technique similar to saturated absorption spectroscopy; however, the pump beam is modulated (typically by a phase shifter Electro-optic modulator), these modulations are transferred to the probe beam via Four-wave mixing, and their amplitude is measured using phase-sensitive detection.

MTS naturally generates dispersive lineshapes on a flat zero background with the zero crossing at the transition. The point of zero crossing and the overall lineshape are very stable. The MTS signals from closed transitions dominate the spectrum; as a result, there is usually one clear signal from the hyperfine structure. These qualities make it ideal for laser locking.
