= Toshiki Tajima =

Japanese physicist

- 田島俊樹
- Born: January 18, 1948 (age 78); Aichi, Japan
- Education: University of Tokyo (B.S., M.S.); University of California, Irvine (Ph.D.)
- Known for: Pioneering laser wakefield acceleration
- Awards: Nishina Memorial Prize (2006); Enrico Fermi Prize (2015); Robert R. Wilson Prize (2019); Hannes Alfvén Prize (2019); Charles Hard Townes Award (2020)
- Scientific career
- Fields: Plasma physics
- Workplaces: University of Texas at Austin; Lawrence Livermore National Laboratory; SLAC National Accelerator Laboratory; LMU Munich; University of California, Irvine; TAE Technologies
- Thesis: (1975)

Toshiki Tajima (Japanese: 田島俊樹, Hepburn: Tajima Toshiki; born January 18, 1948) is a Japanese theoretical plasma physicist known for pioneering the laser wakefield acceleration technique with John M. Dawson in 1979. The technique is used to accelerate particles in a plasma and was experimentally realized in 1994, for which Tajima received several awards such as the Nishina Memorial Prize (2006), the Enrico Fermi Prize (2015), the Robert R. Wilson Prize (2019), the Hannes Alfvén Prize (2019) and the Charles Hard Townes Award (2020).

Tajima is currently a professor of the University of California, Irvine, and is the Chief Science Officer of TAE Technologies. His works involve plasma physics, laser physics, nuclear fusion, plasma astrophysics, accelerator physics and medical applications of physics.

== Early life and career ==
Tajima was born in the Aichi prefecture of Japan in 1948. He graduated from the University of Tokyo with a bachelor's degree in 1971 and a master's degree in 1973. He then received his doctorate from the University of California, Irvine in 1975, and became a post-doctoral student at the University of California, Los Angeles. In 1980, he became a professor at the University of Texas at Austin, where he remained until 2001.

From 1998 to 2001, Tajima was Special Assistant to the Associate Director at the Lawrence Livermore National Laboratory, and from 2000 to 2002 he worked at the SLAC National Accelerator Laboratory. From 2002, he was director of the Kansai Photon Science Institute of the Japan Atomic Energy Agency, and from 2008 to 2011 he was a professor at LMU Munich. He has also been at the KEK accelerator since 2008. He is currently a Rostoker Chair Professor at the University of California, Irvine.

Tajima was Chairman of the International Committee for Ultrahigh Intensity Lasers (ICUIL) and Deputy Director of the International Center for Zetta-Exawatt Science and Technology (IZEST) at École Polytechnique (with director Gérard Mourou). He was Blaise Pascal Professor and Einstein Professor at the Chinese Academy of Sciences.

Tajima is also the Chief Science Officer of TAE Technologies, a company founded in 1998 that deals with aneutronic fusion power.

== Honors and awards ==
Tajima is a fellow of the Japan Society for the Promotion of Science and of The Optical Society.

For his work on laser wakefield acceleration, Tajima received the Nishina Memorial Prize in 2006; the Enrico Fermi Prize of the Italian Physical Society in 2015; the Robert R. Wilson Prize of the American Physical Society the Hannes Alfvén Prize of the European Physical Society in 2019; and the Charles Hard Townes Award from The Optical Society in 2020.

== Publications ==
- Tajima, T.; Dawson, J. M. (1979). "Laser Electron Accelerator". Physical Review Letters. 43 (4): 267–270. Bibcode:1979PhRvL..43..267T. doi:10.1103/PhysRevLett.43.267. ISSN 0031-9007.
- Joshi, C.; Tajima, T.; Dawson, J. M.; Baldis, H. A.; Ebrahim, N. A. (1981). "Forward Raman Instability and Electron Acceleration". Physical Review Letters. 47 (18): 1285–1288. Bibcode:1981PhRvL..47.1285J. doi:10.1103/physrevlett.47.1285. ISSN 0031-9007.
- Shibata, K.; Tajima, T.; Steinolfson, R. S.; Matsumoto, R. (1989). "Two-dimensional magnetohydrodynamic model of emerging magnetic flux in the solar atmosphere". The Astrophysical Journal. 345: 584. Bibcode:1989ApJ...345..584S. doi:10.1086/167932. ISSN 0004-637X.
- Matsumoto, R.; Tajima, T. (1995). "Magnetic viscosity by localized shear flow instability in magnetized accretion disks". The Astrophysical Journal. 445: 767. Bibcode:1995ApJ...445..767M. doi:10.1086/175739. ISSN 0004-637X. S2CID 221954114.
- Esirkepov, T. Zh.; Bulanov, S. V.; Nishihara, K.; Tajima, T.; Pegoraro, F.; Khoroshkov, V. S.; Mima, K.; Daido, H.; Kato, Y.; Kitagawa, Y.; Nagai, K. (2002). "Proposed Double-Layer Target for the Generation of High-Quality Laser-Accelerated Ion Beams". Physical Review Letters. 89 (17) 175003. arXiv:physics/0211104. Bibcode:2002PhRvL..89q5003E. doi:10.1103/physrevlett.89.175003. ISSN 0031-9007. PMID 12398678. S2CID 32168818.
- Matsukado, K.; Esirkepov, T.; Kinoshita, K.; Daido, H.; Utsumi, T.; Li, Z.; Fukumi, A.; Hayashi, Y.; Orimo, S.; Nishiuchi, M.; Bulanov, S. V. (2003). "Energetic Protons from a Few-Micron Metallic Foil Evaporated by an Intense Laser Pulse". Physical Review Letters. 91 (21) 215001. Bibcode:2003PhRvL..91u5001M. doi:10.1103/physrevlett.91.215001. ISSN 0031-9007. PMID 14683311. S2CID 206328379.
- Bulanov, Sergei V.; Esirkepov, Timur; Tajima, Toshiki (2004). "Erratum: Light Intensification towards the Schwinger Limit [Phys. Rev. Lett.91, 085001 (2003)]". Physical Review Letters. 92 (15) 159901. Bibcode:2004PhRvL..92o9901B. doi:10.1103/physrevlett.92.159901. ISSN 0031-9007.
- Esirkepov, T.; Borghesi, M.; Bulanov, S. V.; Mourou, G.; Tajima, T. (2004). "Highly Efficient Relativistic-Ion Generation in the Laser-Piston Regime". Physical Review Letters. 92 (17) 175003. arXiv:physics/0405083. Bibcode:2004PhRvL..92q5003E. doi:10.1103/physrevlett.92.175003. ISSN 0031-9007. PMID 15169160. S2CID 119486086.
- Mourou, Gerard A.; Tajima, Toshiki; Bulanov, Sergei V. (2006). "Optics in the relativistic regime". Reviews of Modern Physics. 78 (2): 309–371. Bibcode:2006RvMP...78..309M. doi:10.1103/revmodphys.78.309. ISSN 0034-6861.
