= Optical microcavity =

Structure formed by reflecting faces

Time-resolved simulation of the dynamics of a pulse illuminating a microcavity.

An optical microcavity or microresonator is a structure formed by reflecting faces on the two sides of a spacer layer or optical medium, or by wrapping a waveguide in a circular fashion to form a ring. The former type is a standing wave cavity, and the latter is a traveling wave cavity. The name microcavity stems from the fact that it is often only a few micrometers thick, the spacer layer sometimes even in the nanometer range. As with common lasers, this forms an optical cavity or optical resonator, allowing a standing wave to form inside the spacer layer or a traveling wave that goes around in the ring.

== Applications and effects ==
The fundamental difference between a conventional optical cavity and microcavities is the effects that arise from the small dimensions of the system, but their operational principle can often be understood in the same way as for larger optical resonators. Quantum effects of the light's electromagnetic field can be observed. For example, the spontaneous emission rate and behaviour of atoms is altered by such a microcavity, a phenomenon that is referred to as inhibited spontaneous emission. One can imagine this as the situation that no photon is emitted, if the environment is a box that is too small to hold it. This leads to an altered emission spectrum, which is significantly narrowed.

Moreover, nonlinear effects are enhanced by orders of magnitude due to the strong light confinement, leading to the generation of microresonator frequency combs, low-power parametric processes such as down-conversion, second-harmonic generation, four-wave mixing and optical parametric oscillation. Several of these nonlinear processes themselves lead to the generation of quantum states of light. Another field that harnesses the strong confinement of light is cavity optomechanics, where the back-and-forth interaction of the light beam with the mechanical motion of the resonator becomes strongly coupled. Even in this field, quantum effects can start playing a role.

Microcavities have many applications, frequently at present in optoelectronics, where vertical cavity surface emitting lasers VCSEL are probably the best known. Recently, a single photon emitting device was demonstrated by placing a quantum dot in a microcavity. These light sources are interesting for quantum cryptography and quantum computers.

An overview is given in the review article published in the journal Nature.

== Types ==
=== Standing-wave ===
For a microcavity supporting a single-mode or a few standing-wave modes, the thickness of the spacer layer determines the so-called "cavity-mode", which is the one wavelength that can be transmitted and will be formed as a standing wave inside the resonator. Depending on the type and quality of the mirrors, a so-called stop-band will form in the transmission spectrum of the microcavity, a long range of wavelengths, that is reflected and a single one being transmitted (usually in the centre). There are different means of fabricating standing-wave microcavities, either by evaporating alternating layers of dielectric media to form the mirrors (DBR) and the medium inside the spacer layer or by modification of semiconductor material or by metal mirrors.

=== Traveling-wave ===
Often just called "microresonators", traveling wave microcavities have a wave going around in a loop-like fashion in a preferred direction, depending on the input light direction. They can be in the form of whispering-gallery resonators, or as integrated ring resonators. Typical materials from which they are made could be semiconductors like Silicon, Silicon dioxide, silicon nitride, crystalline fluorides (CaF_{2}, MgF_{2}, SrF_{2}) or lithium niobate. The material is chosen such that it is low-loss and transparent in the wavelength of application desired. Typically, such structures are fabricated by either diamond turning or micromachining a cylindrical rod of a material (especially for fluorides and lithium niobate), or by photolithography and electron-beam lithography to produce a patterned resonator on chip (for silicon-based materials).

When an integer number of wavelengths in the material fits in the circumference of the resonator, a resonant wave is excited by constructive interference. At resonance, the light field can be enhanced by several hundred to several million times, quantified by the Finesse Coefficient of the resonator. This also leads to an ultrahigh quality factor, meaning that light travels around the circumference many million times before decaying into the surroundings.

== Photonic atoms and molecules ==
The properties of quantized confined photon states in optical micro- and nanocavities are very similar to those of confined electron states in atoms. Owing to this similarity, optical microcavities can be termed 'photonic atoms'. Taking this analogy even further, a cluster of several mutually-coupled photonic atoms forms a photonic molecule. When individual photonic atoms are brought into close proximity, their optical modes interact and give rise to a spectrum of hybridized super-modes of photonic molecules. This is very similar to what happens when two isolated systems are coupled, like two hydrogen atomic orbitals coming together to form the bonding and antibonding orbitals of the hydrogen molecule, which are hybridized super-modes of the total coupled system.

"A micrometer-sized piece of semiconductor can trap photons inside it in such a way that they act like electrons in an atom. Now the 21 September PRL describes a way to link two of these "photonic atoms" together. The result of such a close relationship is a "photonic molecule," whose optical modes bear a strong resemblance to the electronic states of a diatomic molecule like hydrogen." "Photonic molecules, named by analogy with chemical molecules, are clusters of closely located electromagnetically interacting microcavities or "photonic atoms"." "Optically coupled microcavities have emerged as photonic structures with promising properties for investigation of fundamental science as well as for applications."

The first photonic realization of the two-level system of a photonic molecule was by Spreew et al., who used optical fibers to realize a ring resonator, although they did not use the term "photonic molecule". The two modes forming the molecule could then be the polarization modes of the ring or the clockwise and counterclockwise modes of the ring. This was followed by the demonstration of a lithographically fabricated photonic molecule, inspired by an analogy with a simple diatomic molecule. However, other nature-inspired PM structures (such as 'photonic benzene') have been proposed and shown to support confined optical modes closely analogous to the ground-state molecular orbitals of their chemical counterparts.

Photonic molecules offer advantages over isolated photonic atoms in a variety of applications, including bio(chemical) sensing, cavity optomechanics, and microlasers, Photonic molecules can also be used as quantum simulators of many-body physics and as building blocks of future optical quantum information processing networks.

In complete analogy, clusters of metal nanoparticles – which support confined surface plasmon states – have been termed 'plasmonic molecules."

Finally, hybrid photonic-plasmonic (or opto-plasmonic) and elastic molecules have also been proposed and demonstrated.

== See also ==
- Vertical-cavity surface-emitting laser
