= Maxwell–Bloch equations =

Model of a quantum/optical system

The Maxwell–Bloch equations, also called the optical Bloch equations describe the dynamics of a two-state quantum system interacting with the electromagnetic mode of an optical resonator. Their first formulation was due to Tito Arecchi and Rodolfo Bonifacio. They are analogous to (but not at all equivalent to) the Bloch equations which describe the motion of the nuclear magnetic moment in an electromagnetic field. The equations can be derived either semiclassically or with the field fully quantized when certain approximations are made.

== Semi-classical formulation ==
The derivation of the semi-classical optical Bloch equations is nearly identical to solving the two-state quantum system (see the discussion there). However, usually one casts these equations into a density matrix form. The system we are dealing with can be described by the wave function:

$$\psi = c_g\psi_g + c_e\psi_e$$
$$\left|c_g\right|^2 + \left|c_e\right|^2 = 1$$

The density matrix is

$$\rho = \begin{bmatrix}\rho_{ee} & \rho_{eg} \\ \rho_{ge} & \rho_{gg}\end{bmatrix} = \begin{bmatrix}c_e c_{e}^* & c_e c_{g}^* \\ c_g c_{e}^* & c_g c_{g}^* \end{bmatrix}$$

(other conventions are possible; this follows the derivation in Metcalf (1999)). One can now solve the Heisenberg equation of motion, or translate the results from solving the Schrödinger equation into density matrix form. One arrives at the following equations, including spontaneous emission:

$$\frac{d \rho_{gg}}{dt} = \gamma \rho_{ee} + \frac{i}{2}(\Omega^* \bar \rho_{eg} - \Omega\bar \rho_{ge})$$
$$\frac{d \rho_{ee}}{dt} = -\gamma \rho_{ee} + \frac{i}{2}(\Omega \bar \rho_{ge} - \Omega^*\bar \rho_{eg})$$
$$\frac{d \bar \rho_{ge}}{dt} = -\left( \frac{\gamma}{2} + i\delta \right) \bar \rho_{ge} + \frac{i}{2}\Omega^*(\rho_{ee} - \rho_{gg})$$
$$\frac{d \bar \rho_{eg}}{dt} = - \left( \frac{\gamma}{2} - i\delta \right) \bar \rho_{eg} + \frac{i}{2}\Omega(\rho_{gg} - \rho_{ee})$$

In the derivation of these formulae, we define $\bar \rho_{ge} \equiv \rho_{ge}e^{-i\delta t}$ and $\bar \rho_{eg} \equiv \rho_{eg}e^{i\delta t}$. It was also explicitly assumed that spontaneous emission is described by an exponential decay of the coefficient $\rho_{eg}(t)$ with decay constant $\frac{\gamma}{2}$. $\Omega$ is the Rabi frequency, which is

$$\Omega =\vec{d_{g,e}}\cdot \vec{E_0}/\hbar$$,

and $\delta = \omega - \omega_{0}$ is the detuning and measures how far the light frequency, $\omega$, is from the transition, $\omega_{0}$. Here, $\vec{d}_{g,e}$ is the transition dipole moment for the $g \rightarrow e$ transition and $\vec{E}_{0} = \hat{\epsilon}E_{0}$ is the vector electric field amplitude including the polarization (in the sense $\vec{E} = \frac{\vec{E_0}}{2}e^{-i\omega t}+c.c.$).

== Derivation from cavity quantum electrodynamics ==
Beginning with the Jaynes–Cummings Hamiltonian under coherent drive

$$H=\omega_c a^\dagger a + \omega_a \sigma^\dagger\sigma+ig(a^\dagger\sigma-a\sigma^\dagger)+iJ(a^\dagger e^{-i\omega_l t}-a e^{i\omega_l t})$$

where $a$ is the lowering operator for the cavity field, and $\sigma=\frac{1}{2}\left(\sigma_x - i\sigma_y\right)$ is the atomic lowering operator written as a combination of Pauli matrices. The time dependence can be removed by transforming the wavefunction according to $|\psi\rangle\rightarrow \operatorname{e}^{-i\omega_l t\left(a^\dagger a + \sigma^\dagger\sigma\right)}|\psi\rangle$, leading to a transformed Hamiltonian

$$H=\Delta_c a^\dagger a + \Delta_a \sigma^\dagger\sigma+ig(a^\dagger\sigma-a\sigma^\dagger)+iJ( a^\dagger-a)$$

where $\Delta_i = \omega_i - \omega_l$. As it stands now, the Hamiltonian has four terms. The first two are the self energy of the atom (or other two level system) and field. The third term is an energy conserving interaction term allowing the cavity and atom to exchange population and coherence. These three terms alone give rise to the Jaynes-Cummings ladder of dressed states, and the associated anharmonicity in the energy spectrum. The last term models coupling between the cavity mode and a classical field, i.e. a laser. The drive strength $J$ is given in terms of the power transmitted through the empty two-sided cavity as $J=\sqrt{2P(\Delta_c^2 + \kappa^2)/(\omega_c \kappa)}$, where $2\kappa$ is the cavity linewidth. This brings to light a crucial point concerning the role of dissipation in the operation of a laser or other CQED device; dissipation is the means by which the system (coupled atom/cavity) interacts with its environment. To this end, dissipation is included by framing the problem in terms of the master equation, where the last two terms are in the Lindblad form

$$\dot{\rho}=-i[H,\rho] + 2\kappa\left(a\rho a^\dagger -\frac{1}{2}\left(a^\dagger a \rho + \rho a^\dagger a\right)\right) + 2\gamma\left(\sigma\rho
\sigma^\dagger -\frac{1}{2}\left(\sigma^\dagger \sigma\rho + \rho \sigma^\dagger \sigma\right)\right)$$

The equations of motion for the expectation values of the operators can be derived from the master equation by the formulas $\langle O \rangle = \operatorname{tr}\left(O\rho\right)$ and $\langle\dot{O}\rangle = \operatorname{tr}\left(O\dot{\rho}\right)$. The equations of motion for $\langle a\rangle$, $\langle\sigma\rangle$, and $\langle\sigma_z\rangle$, the cavity field, atomic coherence, and atomic inversion respectively, are

$$\frac{d}{dt}\langle a \rangle = i\left(-\Delta_c \langle a \rangle - ig\langle \sigma\rangle - iJ\right) -\kappa \langle a \rangle$$
$$\frac{d}{dt}\langle \sigma \rangle = i\left(-\Delta_a \langle \sigma \rangle - ig\langle a \sigma_z \rangle\right) -\gamma \langle \sigma \rangle$$
$$\frac{d}{dt}\langle \sigma_z \rangle = -2g\left(\langle a^\dagger \sigma \rangle+\langle a \sigma^\dagger \rangle\right) -2\gamma \langle \sigma_z\rangle-2\gamma$$

At this point, we have produced three of an infinite ladder of coupled equations. As can be seen from the third equation, higher order correlations are necessary. The differential equation for the time evolution of $\langle a^\dagger \sigma \rangle$ will contain expectation values of higher order products of operators, thus leading to an infinite set of coupled equations. We heuristically make the approximation that the expectation value of a product of operators is equal to the product of expectation values of the individual operators. This is akin to assuming that the operators are uncorrelated, and is a good approximation in the classical limit. It turns out that the resulting equations give the correct qualitative behavior even in the single excitation regime. Additionally, to simplify the equations we make the following replacements

$$\langle a \rangle = (\gamma/\sqrt{2} g)x$$
$$\langle \sigma \rangle = -p/\sqrt{2}$$
$$\langle \sigma_z\rangle = -D$$
$$\Theta = \Delta_c/\kappa$$
$$C = g^2/2\kappa\gamma$$
$$y = \sqrt{2} g J/\kappa\gamma$$
$$\Delta=\Delta_a/\gamma$$

And the Maxwell–Bloch equations can be written in their final form

$$\dot{x}=\kappa\left(-2Cp+y-(i\Theta+1)x\right)$$
$$\dot{p} = \gamma\left( -(1+i\Delta)p + xD\right)$$
$$\dot{D}=\gamma\left(2(1-D)-(x^*p+xp^*)\right)$$

== Application: atom–laser interaction ==
Within the dipole approximation and rotating-wave approximation, the dynamics of the atomic density matrix, when interacting with laser field, is described by optical Bloch equation, whose effect can be divided into two parts: optical dipole force and scattering force.

== See also ==
- Atomic electron transition
- Lorenz system
- Semiconductor Bloch equations
