= Tito Arecchi =

Italian physicist (1933–2021)

- Born: 11 December 1933; Reggio Calabria, Kingdom of Italy
- Died: 15 February 2021 (aged 87); Florence, Italy
- Occupation: Physicist

Tito Arecchi (11 December 1933 – 15 February 2021) was an Italian physicist who made significant contributions to laser physics and quantum optics.

== Biography ==
Arecchi graduated from the Polytechnic University of Milan in 1957 with a degree in electrical engineering. He became an assistant professor at the University of Milan in 1963 and a physics professor at the University of Pavia in 1970. From 1975 until his retirement in 2008, he was a physics professor at the University of Florence. He also served as a guest professor at the Massachusetts Institute of Technology from 1969 to 1970 and was invited to IBM research laboratories in San Jose and Zürich.

He and Rodolfo Bonifacio independently derived the equations known as Maxwell-Bloch equations.

Arecchi was President of the National Optical Institute from 1975 to 2000. In 1995, he was awarded the Max Born Award by The Optical Society. In 2006, the Italian Physical Society awarded he and Giorgio Careri the Premio Enrico Fermi for their contributions to the study of radiation and matter.

Arecchi died from a fall in Florence on 15 February 2021, at the age of 87.

== Articles ==
- Instabilities and Chaos in Quantum Optics (1987)
- I simboli e la realtà (1990)
- Optical chaos (selected papers on) (1994)
- Lexicon of Complexity (1996)
- Determinismo e Complessità (2000)
- Caos e Complessità nel Vivente (2004)
- Coerenza, Complessità, Creatività (2007)
