= Frequency comb =

Laser source with equal intervals of spectral lines

A frequency comb or spectral comb is represented by a spectrum made of discrete, stable and regularly spaced spectral lines. In optics, a frequency comb can be generated by certain laser sources.

A number of mechanisms exist for obtaining an optical frequency comb, including periodic modulation (in amplitude and/or phase) of a continuous-wave laser, four-wave mixing in nonlinear media, or stabilization of the pulse train generated by a mode-locked laser. Much work has been devoted to this last mechanism, which was developed around the turn of the 21st century and ultimately led to one half of the Nobel Prize in Physics being shared by John L. Hall and Theodor W. Hänsch in 2005.

The frequency domain representation of a perfect frequency comb is like a Dirac comb, a series of delta functions spaced according to

$$f_n = f_0 + n\,f_r,$$

where $n$ is an integer, $f_r$ is the comb tooth spacing (equal to the mode-locked laser's repetition rate or, alternatively, the modulation frequency), and $f_0$ is the carrier offset frequency, which is less than $f_r$.

Combs spanning an octave in frequency (i.e., a factor of two) can be used to directly measure (and correct for drifts in) $f_0$. Thus, octave-spanning combs can be used to steer a piezoelectric mirror within a carrier–envelope phase-correcting feedback loop. Any mechanism by which the combs' two degrees of freedom ($f_r$ and $f_0$) are stabilized generates a comb that is useful for mapping optical frequencies into the radio frequency for the direct measurement of optical frequency.

An ultrashort pulse of light in the time domain. The electric field is a sinusoid with a Gaussian envelope. The pulse length is on the order of a few 100 fs.

== Generation ==
=== Using a mode-locked laser ===
A Dirac comb is an infinite series of Dirac delta functions spaced at intervals of T; the Fourier transform of a time-domain Dirac comb is a Dirac comb in the frequency domain.

The most popular way of generating a frequency comb is with a mode-locked laser. Such lasers produce a series of optical pulses separated in time by the round-trip time of the laser cavity. The spectrum of such a pulse train approximates a series of Dirac delta functions separated by the repetition rate (the inverse of the round-trip time) of the laser. This series of sharp spectral lines is called a frequency comb or a frequency Dirac comb.

The most common lasers used for frequency-comb generation are Ti:sapphire solid-state lasers or Er:fiber lasers with repetition rates typically between 100 MHz and 1 GHz or even going as high as 10 GHz.

=== Using four-wave mixing ===
Four-wave mixing is a process where intense light at three frequencies $f_1,f_2,f_3$ interact to produce light at a fourth frequency $f_4 = f_1 + f_2 - f_3$. If the three frequencies are part of a perfectly spaced frequency comb, then the fourth frequency is mathematically required to be part of the same comb as well.

Starting with intense light at two or more equally spaced frequencies, this process can generate light at more and more different equally spaced frequencies. For example, if there are a lot of photons at two frequencies $f_1,f_2$, four-wave mixing could generate light at the new frequency $2f_1 - f_2$. This new frequency would get gradually more intense, and light can subsequently cascade to more and more new frequencies on the same comb.

Therefore, a conceptually simple way to make an optical frequency comb is to take two high-power lasers of slightly different frequency and shine them simultaneously through a photonic-crystal fiber. This creates a frequency comb by four-wave mixing as described above.

==== In microresonators ====
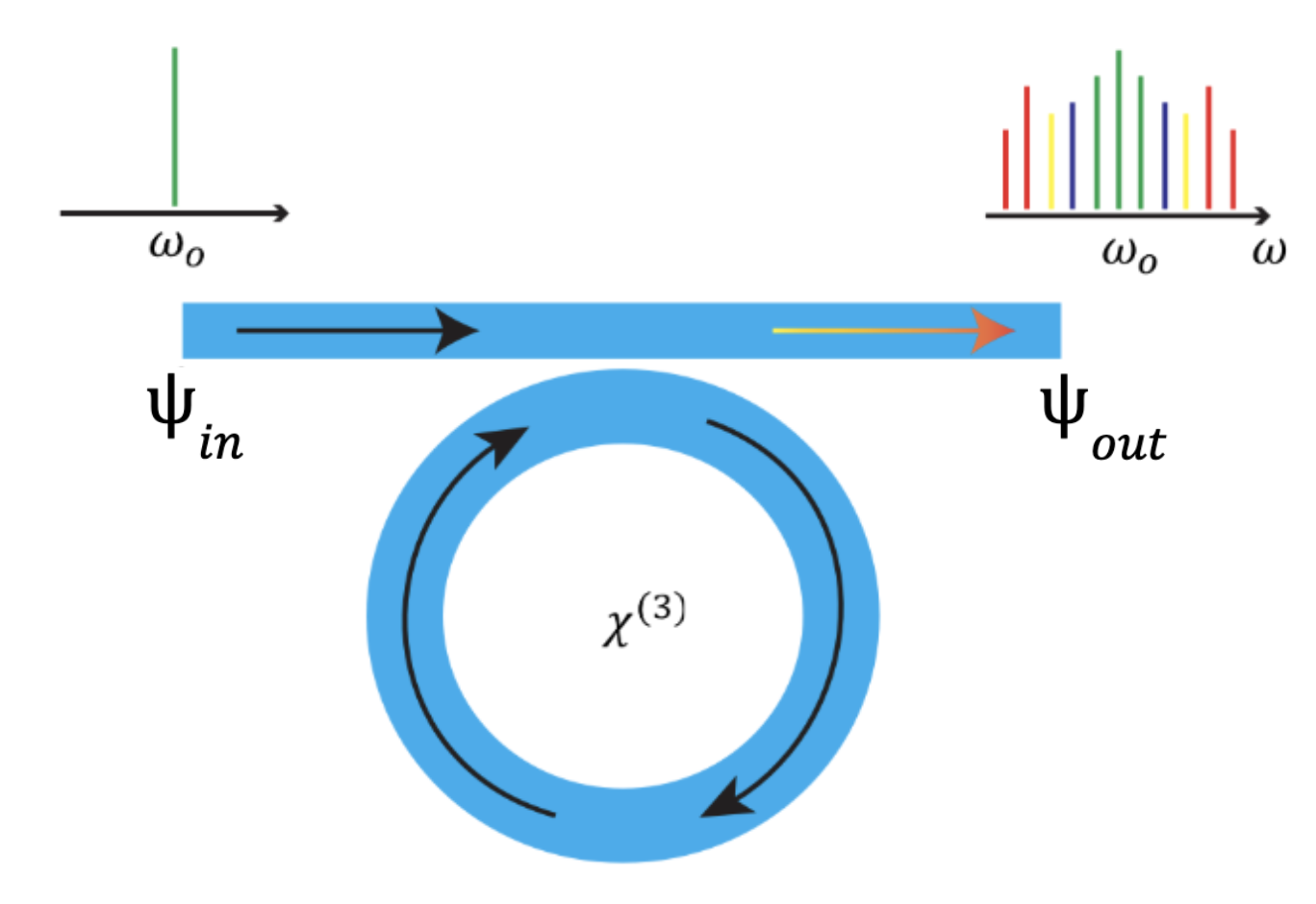
Schematic of a frequency comb generated in a microresonator. The schematic here uses a third-order nonlinear resonator, but frequency combs can be generated in second-order nonlinear resonators.

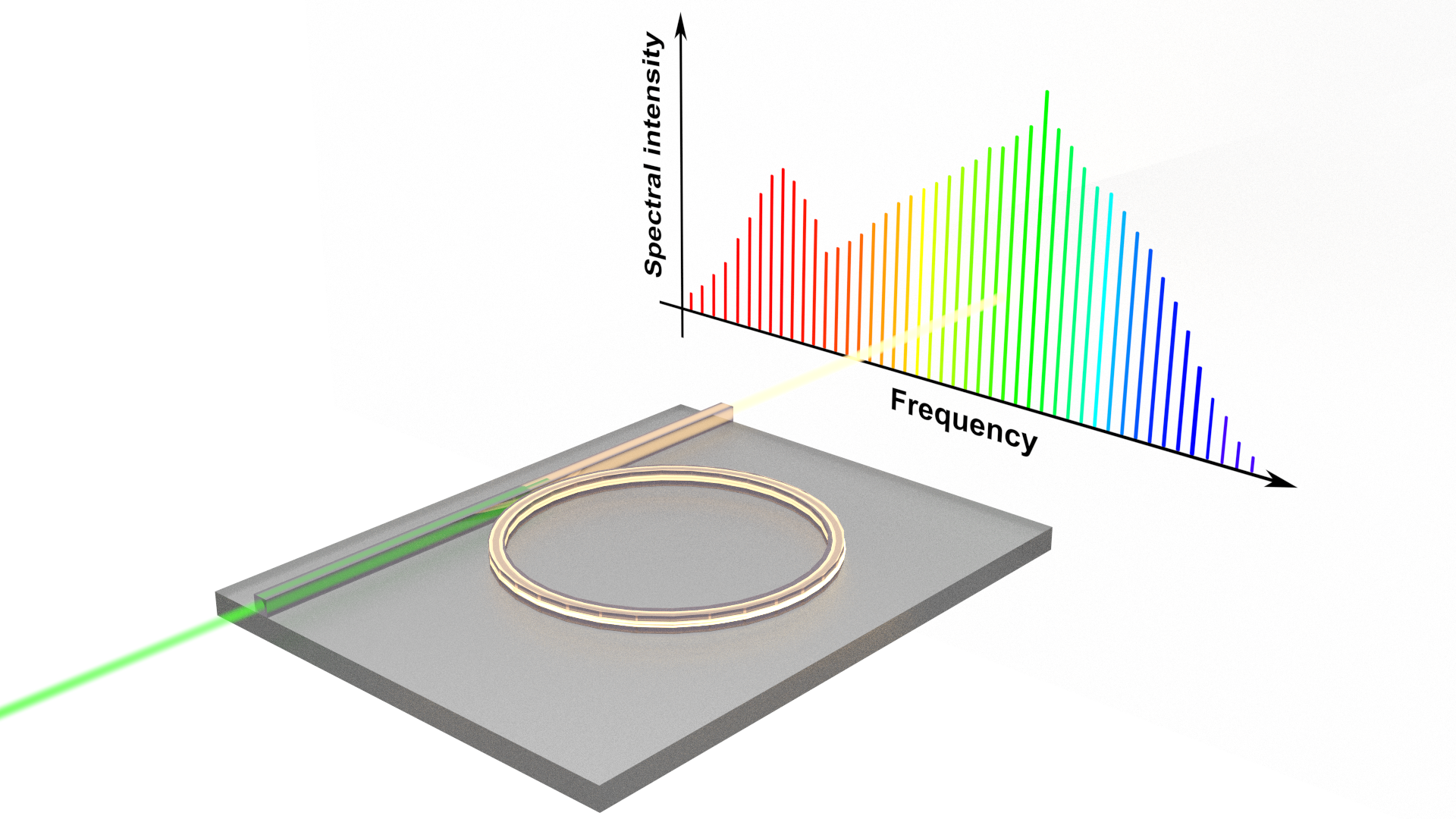
Schematic depiction of the generation of an optical frequency comb in a ring resonator

An alternative variation of four-wave-mixing-based frequency combs is known as Kerr frequency comb. Here, a single laser is coupled into a microresonator (such as a microscopic glass disk that has whispering-gallery modes). This kind of structure naturally has a series of resonant modes with approximately equally spaced frequencies (similar to a Fabry–Pérot interferometer). Unfortunately the resonant modes are not exactly equally spaced due to dispersion. Nevertheless, the four-wave mixing effect above can create and stabilize a perfect frequency comb in such a structure. Basically, the system generates a perfect comb that overlaps the resonant modes as much as possible. In fact, nonlinear effects can shift the resonant modes to improve the overlap with the perfect comb even more. (The resonant mode frequencies depend on refractive index, which is altered by the optical Kerr effect.)

In the time domain, while mode-locked lasers almost always emit a series of short pulses, Kerr frequency combs generally do not. However, a special sub-type of Kerr frequency comb, in which a "cavity soliton" forms in the microresonator, does emit a series of pulses.

=== Using electro-optic modulation of a continuous-wave laser ===
An optical frequency comb can be generated by modulating the amplitude and/or phase of a continuous-wave laser with an external modulator driven by a radio-frequency source. In this manner, the frequency comb is centered around the optical frequency provided by the continuous-wave laser and the modulation frequency or repetition rate is given by the external radio-frequency source. The advantage of this method is that it can reach much higher repetition rates (>10 GHz) than with mode-locked lasers and the two degrees of freedom of the comb can be set independently. The number of lines is lower than with a mode-locked laser (typically a few tens), but the bandwidth can be significantly broadened with nonlinear fibers. This type of optical frequency comb is usually called electrooptic frequency comb. The first schemes used a phase modulator inside an integrated Fabry–Perot cavity, but with advances in electro-optic modulators new arrangements are possible.

=== Low-frequency combs using electronics ===
A purely electronic device which generates a series of pulses, also generates a frequency comb. These are produced for electronic sampling oscilloscopes, but also used for frequency comparison of microwaves, because they reach up to 1 THz. Since they include 0 Hz, they do not need the tricks which make up the rest of this article.

== Widening to one octave ==
For many applications, the comb must be widened to at least an octave: that is, the highest frequency in the spectrum must be at least twice the lowest frequency. One of three techniques may be used:

- supercontinuum generation by strong self-phase modulation in nonlinear photonic crystal fiber or integrated waveguide
- a Ti:sapphire laser using intracavity self-phase modulation
- the second harmonic can be generated in a long crystal so that by consecutive sum frequency generation and difference frequency generation the spectrum of first and second harmonic widens until they overlap.

These processes generate new frequencies on the same comb for similar reasons as discussed above.

== Carrier–envelope offset measurement ==
Difference between group and phase velocity leading to carrier–envelope offset

An increasing offset between the optical phase and the maximum of the wave envelope of an optical pulse can be seen on the right. Each line is displaced from a harmonic of the repetition rate by the carrier–envelope offset frequency. The carrier–envelope offset frequency is the rate at which the peak of the carrier frequency slips from the peak of the pulse envelope on a pulse-to-pulse basis.

Measurement of the carrier–envelope offset frequency is usually done with a self-referencing technique, in which the phase of one part of the spectrum is compared to its harmonic. Different possible approaches for carrier–envelope offset phase control were proposed in 1999. The two simplest approaches, which require only one nonlinear optical process, are described in the following.

In the "f − 2f" technique, light at the lower-energy side of the broadened spectrum is doubled using second-harmonic generation (SHG) in a nonlinear crystal, and a heterodyne beat is generated between that and light at the same wavelength on the upper-energy side of the spectrum. This beat signal, detectable with a photodiode, includes a difference-frequency component, which is the carrier–envelope offset frequency.

Conceptually, light at frequency $f_n = f_0 + n\,f_r$ is doubled to $2f_n = 2f_0 + 2n\,f_r$, and mixed with light at the very similar frequency $f_{2n} = f_0 + 2n\,f_r$ to produces a beat signal at frequency $2f_n - f_{2n} = f_0.$ In practice, this is not done with a single frequency $f_n$ but with a range of $n$ values, but the effect is the same

Alternatively, difference-frequency generation (DFG) can be used. From light at opposite ends of the broadened spectrum the difference frequency is generated in a nonlinear crystal, and a heterodyne beat between this mixing product and light at the same wavelength of the original spectrum is measured. This beat frequency, detectable with a photodiode, is the carrier–envelope offset frequency.

Here, light at frequencies $f_n$ and $f_{2n}$ is mixed to produce light at frequency $n\,f_r$. This is then mixed with light at frequency $f_n = f_0 + n\,f_r$ to produce a beat frequency of $f_n - n\,f_r = f_0.$ This avoids the need for frequency doubling at the cost of a second optical mixing step. Again, practical implementation uses a range of $n$ values, not a single one.

Because the phase is measured directly, and not the frequency, it is possible to set the frequency to zero and additionally lock the phase, but because the intensity of the laser and this detector is not very stable, and because the whole spectrum beats in phase, one has to lock the phase on a fraction of the repetition rate.

== Carrier–envelope offset control ==
In the absence of active stabilization, the repetition rate and carrier–envelope offset frequency would be free to drift. They vary with changes in the cavity length, refractive index of laser optics, and nonlinear effects such as the Kerr effect. The repetition rate can be stabilized using a piezoelectric transducer, which moves a mirror to change the cavity length.

In Ti:sapphire lasers using prisms for dispersion control, the carrier–envelope offset frequency can be controlled by tilting the high reflector mirror at the end of the prism pair. This can be done using piezoelectric transducers.

In high repetition rate Ti:sapphire ring lasers, which often use double-chirped mirrors to control dispersion, modulation of the pump power using an acousto-optic modulator is often used to control the offset frequency. The phase slip depends strongly on the Kerr effect, and by changing the pump power one changes the peak intensity of the laser pulse and thus the size of the Kerr phase shift. This shift is far smaller than 6 rad, so an additional device for coarse adjustment is needed. A pair of wedges, one moving in or out of the intra-cavity laser beam can be used for this purpose.

The breakthrough which led to a practical frequency comb was the development of technology for stabilizing the carrier–envelope offset frequency.

An alternative to stabilizing the carrier–envelope offset frequency is to cancel it completely by use of difference frequency generation (DFG). If the difference frequency of light of opposite ends of a broadened spectrum is generated in a nonlinear crystal, the resulting frequency comb is carrier–envelope offset-free since the two spectral parts contributing to the DFG share the same carrier–envelope offset frequency (CEO frequency). This was first proposed in 1999 and demonstrated in 2011 using an erbium fiber frequency comb at the telecom wavelength. This simple approach has the advantage that no electronic feedback loop is needed as in conventional stabilization techniques. It promises to be more robust and stable against environmental perturbations.

== Applications ==
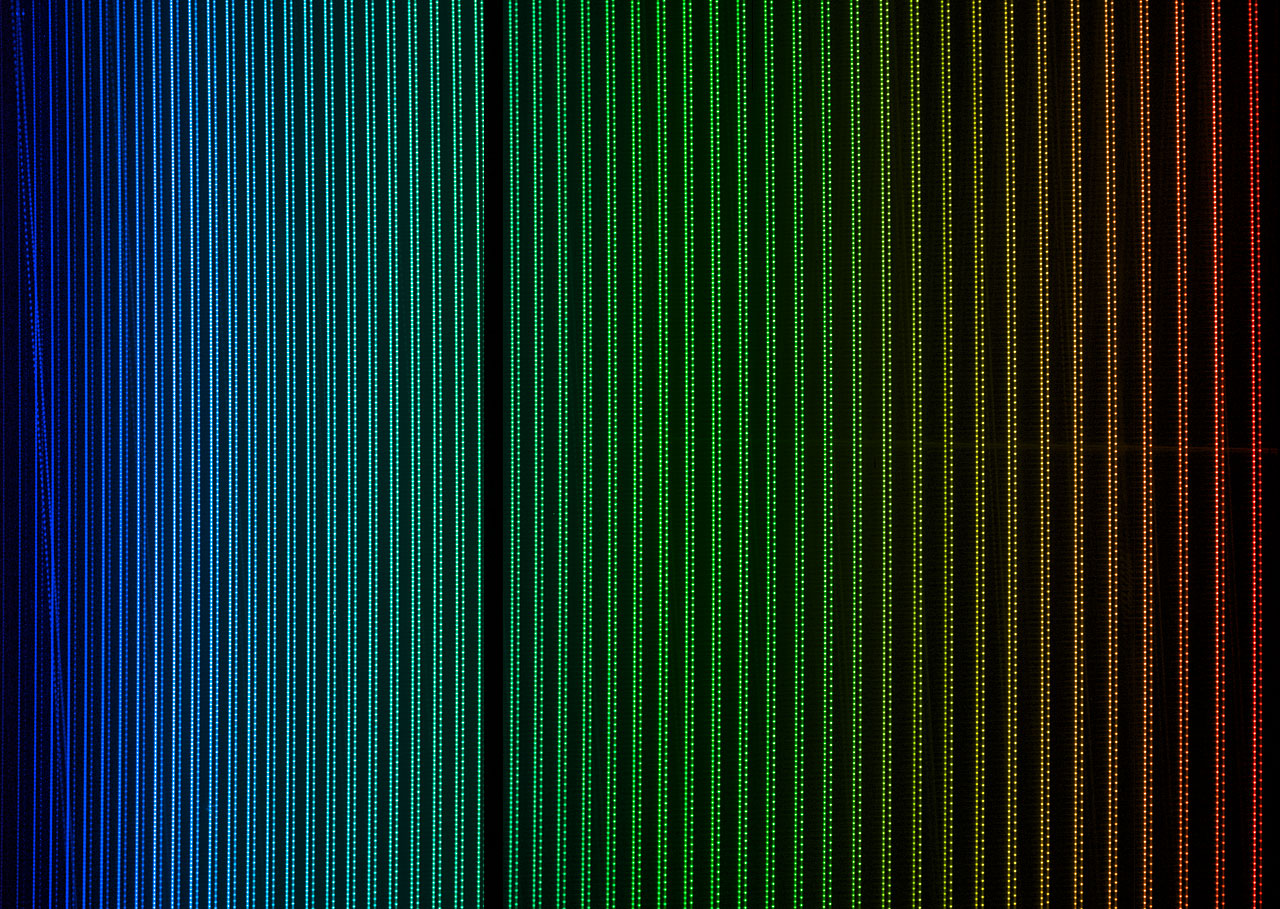
Spectrum of the light from the two-laser frequency combs installed on the High Accuracy Radial Velocity Planet Searcher.

A frequency comb allows a direct link from radio frequency standards to optical frequencies. Current frequency standards such as atomic clocks operate in the microwave region of the spectrum, and the frequency comb brings the accuracy of such clocks into the optical part of the electromagnetic spectrum. A simple electronic feedback loop can lock the repetition rate to a frequency standard.

There are two distinct applications of this technique. One is the optical clock, where an optical frequency is overlapped with a single tooth of the comb on a photodiode, and a radio frequency is compared to the beat signal, the repetition rate, and the CEO-frequency (carrier–envelope offset). Applications for the frequency-comb technique include optical metrology, frequency-chain generation, optical atomic clocks, high-precision spectroscopy, and more precise GPS technology.

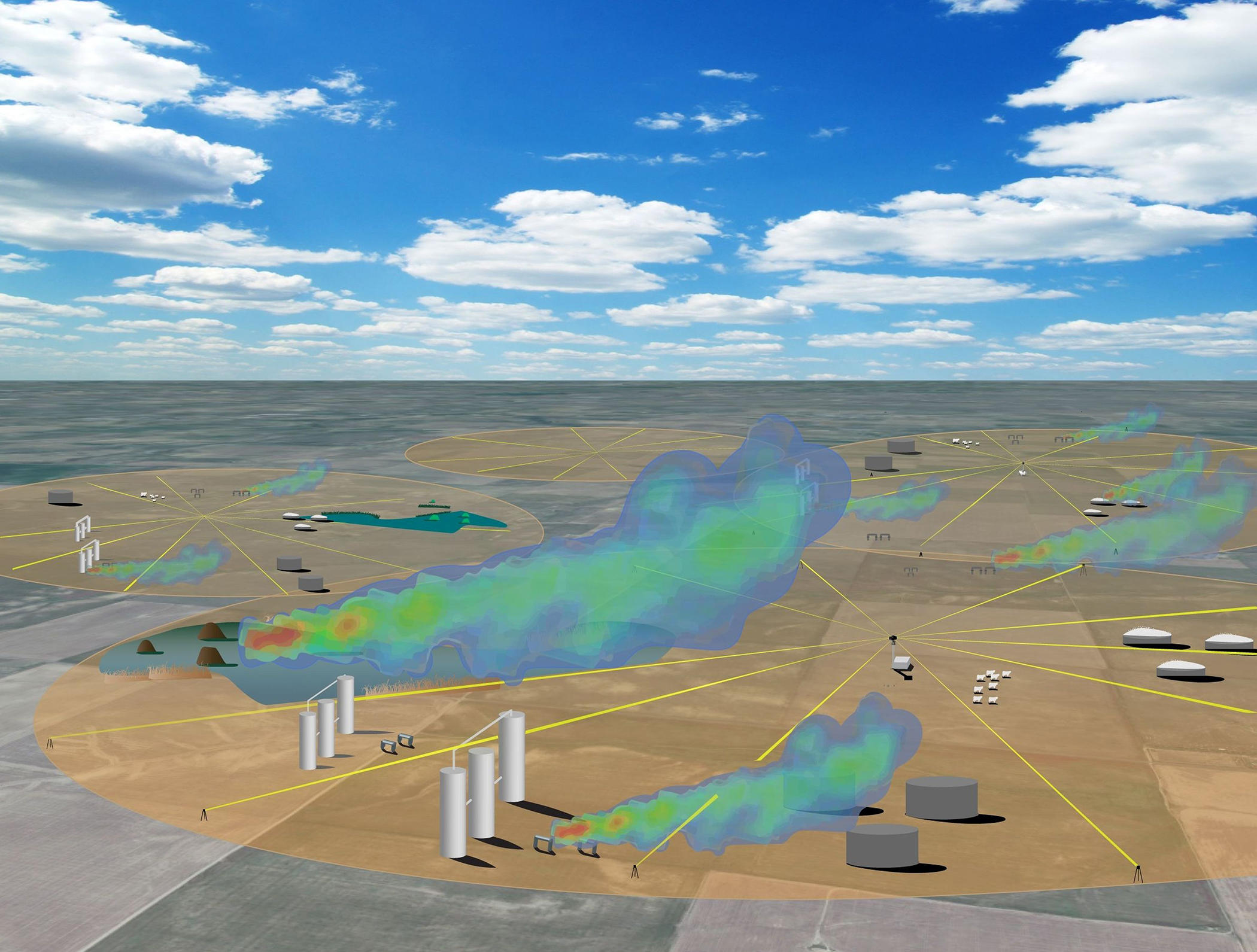
Illustration showing how trace gases are detected in the field using a mobile dual-frequency comb laser spectrometer. The spectrometer sits in the center of a circle which is ringed with retroreflecting mirrors. Laser light from the spectrometer (yellow line) passes through a gas cloud, strikes the retroreflector and is returned directly to its point of origin. The data collected are used to identify leaking trace gases (including methane), as well leak locations and their emission rates.

The other is doing experiments with few-cycle pulses, like above-threshold ionization, attosecond pulses, highly efficient nonlinear optics or high-harmonics generation. These can be single pulses, so that no comb exists, and therefore it is not possible to define a carrier–envelope offset frequency, rather the carrier–envelope offset phase is important. A second photodiode can be added to the setup to gather phase and amplitude in a single shot, or difference-frequency generation can be used to even lock the offset on a single-shot basis, albeit with low power efficiency.

Without an actual comb one can look at the phase vs frequency. Without a carrier–envelope offset all frequencies are cosines. This means that all frequencies have the phase zero. The time origin is arbitrary. If a pulse comes at later times, the phase increases linearly with frequency, but still the zero-frequency phase is zero. This phase at zero frequency is the carrier–envelope offset. The second harmonic not only has twice the frequency, but also twice the phase. Thus for a pulse with zero offset the second harmonic of the low-frequency tail is in phase with the fundamental of the high-frequency tail, and otherwise it is not. Spectral phase interferometry for direct electric-field reconstruction (SPIDER) measures how the phase increases with frequency, but it cannot determine the offset, so the name "electric field reconstruction" is a bit misleading.

In recent years, the frequency comb has been garnering interest for astro-comb applications, extending the use of the technique as a spectrographic observational tool in astronomy.

There are other applications that do not need to lock the carrier–envelope offset frequency to a radio-frequency signal. These include, among others, optical communications, the synthesis of optical arbitrary waveforms, spectroscopy (especially dual-comb spectroscopy) or radio-frequency photonics.

On the other hand, optical frequency combs have found new applications in sensing. Ranging lidars based on dual comb spectroscopy have been developed, enabling high-resolution range measurements at fast update rates. Broadband coupling into high-finesse enhancement cavities have enabled simultaneous quantification of up to 20 molecular species in complex gas samples varying in concentrations by 7 orders of magnitude. Optical frequency combs can also be utilized to measure greenhouse gas emissions with great precision. For instance, in 2019, scientists at NIST employed spectroscopy to quantify methane emissions from oil and gas fields. More recently, a greenhouse gas lidar based on electro-optic combs has been successfully demonstrated.

== History ==
The frequency comb was proposed in 2000. Before its introduction, the EM spectrum was divided between the electronic/radio frequency range and the optical/laser frequency range. The radio frequency range had accurate frequency counters, allowing highly accurate measurements of absolute frequency. The optical range has no such device. The two ranges are separated by a frequency gap of $10^5 \times$.

Before the frequency comb, the only way to bridge the gap were the harmonic frequency chains, which doubles radio frequency in 15 stages, reaching a frequency multiplication of $2^{15} = 10^{4.5}$. However, those were large and expensive to operate. The frequency comb managed to bridge that gap in one stage.

Theodor W. Hänsch and John L. Hall shared half of the 2005 Nobel Prize in Physics for contributions to the development of laser-based precision spectroscopy, including the optical frequency-comb technique. The other half of the prize was awarded to Roy Glauber.

Also in 2005, the femtosecond comb technique was extended to the extreme ultraviolet range, enabling frequency metrology in that region of the spectrum.

== See also ==
- Astro-comb
- Atomic clock
- Bandwidth-limited pulse
- Magneto-optical trap
