= International Institute of Physics =

Research unit of UFRN, Brazil

The International Institute of Physics (IIP) is a research unit of UFRN, located in Natal, Rio Grande do Norte, Brazil with a strong international outlook permanently focused on frontier areas of theoretical physics. In addition to its research activities, the IIP promotes regular workshops, schools, conferences, as well as public lectures. Candidates to IIP openings are selected by international experts, under an open competition regime.
