= Kerr frequency comb =

Optical frequency combs

Kerr frequency combs (also known as microresonator frequency combs) are optical frequency combs which are generated from a continuous wave pump laser by the Kerr nonlinearity. This coherent conversion of the pump laser to a frequency comb takes place inside an optical resonator which is typically of micrometer to millimeter in size and is therefore termed a microresonator. The coherent generation of the frequency comb from a continuous wave laser with the optical nonlinearity as a gain sets Kerr frequency combs apart from today's most common optical frequency combs. These frequency combs are generated by mode-locked lasers where the dominating gain stems from a conventional laser gain medium, which is pumped incoherently. Because Kerr frequency combs only rely on the nonlinear properties of the medium inside the microresonator and do not require a broadband laser gain medium, broad Kerr frequency combs can in principle be generated around any pump frequency.

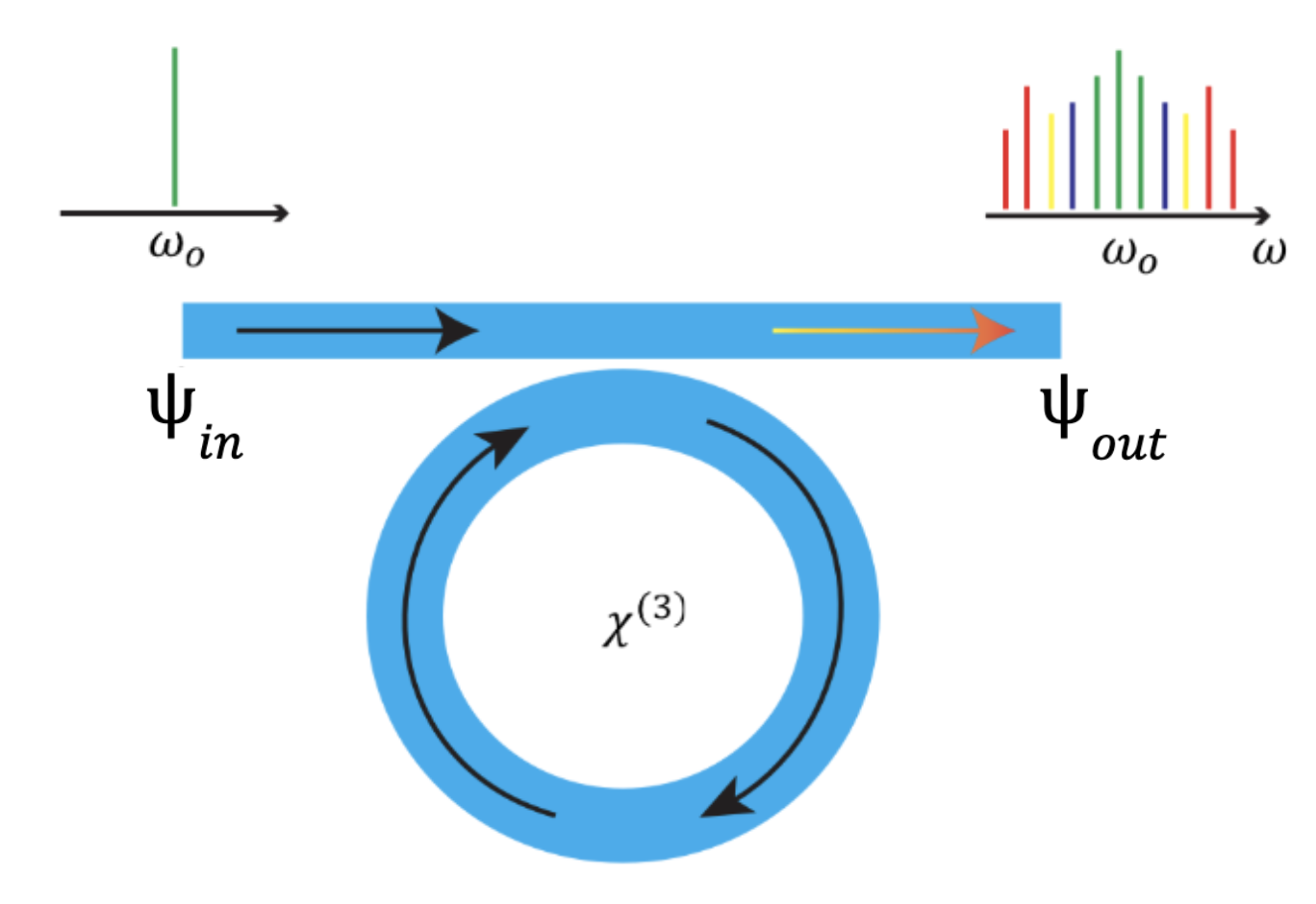
Schematic of a frequency comb generated in a microresonator with a third-order nonlinearity, also called a Kerr microresonator.

While the principle of Kerr frequency combs is applicable to any type of optical resonator, the requirement for Kerr frequency comb generation is a pump laser field intensity above the parametric threshold of the nonlinear process. This requirement is easier to fulfill inside a microresonator because of the possible very low losses inside microresonators (and corresponding high quality factors) and because of the microresonators' small mode volumes. These two features combined result in a large field enhancement of the pump laser inside the microresonator which allow the generation of broad Kerr frequency combs for reasonable powers of the pump laser.

One important property of Kerr frequency combs, which is a direct consequence of the small dimensions of the microresonators and their resulting large free spectral ranges (FSR), is the large mode spacing of typical Kerr frequency combs. For mode-locked lasers this mode spacing, which defines the distance in between adjacent teeth of the frequency comb, is typically in the range of 10 MHz to 1 GHz. For Kerr frequency combs the typical range is from around 10 GHz to 1 THz.

The coherent generation of an optical frequency comb from a continuous wave pump laser is not a unique property of Kerr frequency combs. Optical frequency combs generated with cascaded optical modulators also possess this property. For certain application this property can be advantageous. For example, to stabilize the offset frequency of the Kerr frequency comb one can directly apply feedback to the pump laser frequency. In principle it is also possible to generate a Kerr frequency comb around a particular continuous wave laser in order to use the bandwidth of the frequency comb to determine the exact frequency of the continuous wave laser.

Since their first demonstration in silica micro-toroid resonators, Kerr frequency combs have been demonstrated in a variety of microresonator platforms which notably also include crystalline microresonators and integrated photonics platforms such as waveguide resonators made from silicon nitride. More recent research has expanded the range of available platforms further which now includes diamond, aluminum nitride, lithium niobate, and, for mid-infrared pump wavelengths, silicon.

Because both use the nonlinear effects of the propagation medium, the physics of Kerr frequency combs and of supercontinuum generation from pulsed lasers is very similar. In addition to the nonlinearity, the chromatic dispersion of the medium also plays a crucial role for these systems. As a result of the interplay of nonlinearity and dispersion, solitons can form. The most relevant type of solitons for Kerr frequency comb generation are bright dissipative cavity solitons, which are sometimes also called dissipative Kerr solitons (DKS). These bright solitons have helped to significantly advance the field of Kerr frequency combs as they provide a way to generate ultra-short pulses which in turn represent a coherent, broadband optical frequency comb, in a more reliable fashion than what was possible before.

In its simplest form with only the Kerr nonlinearity and second order dispersion the physics of Kerr frequency combs and dissipative solitons can be described well by the Lugiato–Lefever equation. Other effects such as the Raman effect and higher order dispersion effects require additional terms in the equation.

== See also ==
- Frequency comb
- Mode-locking
- Lugiato–Lefever equation
