= Mark G. Raizen =

American physicist

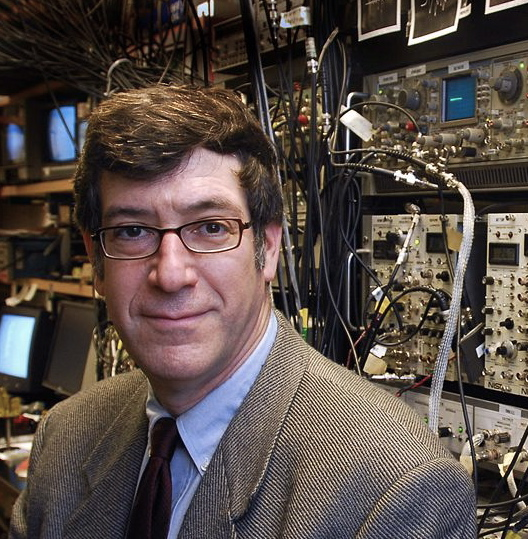

Mark George Raizen is an American physicist who conducts experiments on quantum optics and atom optics.

== Early life and education ==
Raizen was born in New York City. Raizen's uncle, Dr. Robert F. Goldberger, was provost of Columbia University and deputy director for science at the NIH.

Raizen attended the Walden School on the Upper West Side, until his family moved to Israel. He graduated from De Shalit High School and received his undergraduate degree in mathematics from Tel Aviv University in 1980. He continued his graduate education at the University of Texas at Austin, under the guidance of Steven Weinberg (Nobel Prize in Physics, 1979) and Jeff Kimble (California Institute of Technology).

Raizen completed his Ph.D. in 1989. From 1989 to 1991, Raizen was a National Research Council (NRC) post-doc at the Time and Frequency Division of the National Institute of Standards and Technology, working with David Wineland, (Nobel Prize in Physics, 2012).

== Academic career ==
In 1991, Raizen returned to Austin and the University of Texas, where he became an assistant professor of physics. He was promoted to associate professor in 1996 and full professor in 2000. Raizen holds the Sid W. Richardson Foundation Regents Chair in physics. In September 2017, Raizen assumed a joint appointment as a professor in the Department of Pediatrics at the Dell Medical School.

== Scientific career ==
Raizen started his scientific career in theoretical particle physics in 1984 with Steven Weinberg. In 1985, Raizen moved into experimental physics where he began his work with Jeff Kimble. In his graduate work, Raizen was instrumental in one of the first experiments that measured squeezed states of light and also observed the Vacuum Rabi splitting in the optical domain.

While at NIST, Raizen developed a miniature linear ion trap which has become the basis for quantum information with trapped ions.

At the University of Texas, Austin, the research program in the Raizen Group uses laser cooling and trapping of neutral atoms to study fundamental problems. They observed dynamical localization in the momentum of atoms, the quantum suppression of chaos.

In other experiments, Raizen and his group investigated quantum transport of atoms in an accelerating optical lattice. They studied the loss mechanism during the acceleration due to quantum tunneling. For short times, they found a deviation from the exponential decay law in the survival probability. This short-time deviation from exponential decay was then used to suppress or enhance the decay rate, effects known as the Quantum Zeno effect or Anti-Zeno effect.

Raizen and his group built two experiments with Bose–Einstein condensate in rubidium and sodium. They developed a system for the study and control of quantum statistics of atoms and quantum entanglement. The system includes a condensate in an optical box trap together with single atom detection.

In a separate experiment, they demonstrated coherent slowing of supersonic beams. Using an atomic paddle, a slow monochromatic beam of ground state helium was produced. In a different approach, pulsed magnetic fields were used to stop paramagnetic atoms and molecules. To further cool these particles, Raizen and his collaborators introduced the concept of a one-way barrier, or one-way wall, which is used to accumulate atoms or molecules in optical tweezers. This method was realized experimentally by the Raizen Group in December 2007. This cooling method is a physical realization of informational cooling, originally proposed by Leó Szilárd in 1929. This proposal used the concept of information entropy to resolve the paradox of Maxwell's demon. Together, these methods enable the trapping and cooling of atoms that span most of the periodic table and paramagnetic molecules.

In 2009, Raizen and his group built an experiment to study Brownian motion of a bead of glass held in optical tweezers in air. In 1907, Albert Einstein published a paper in which he considered the instantaneous velocity of Brownian motion and showed that it could be used to test the equipartition theorem, one of the basic tenets of statistical mechanics. In this paper, Einstein concluded that the instantaneous velocity would be impossible to measure in practice due to the very rapid randomization of the motion. In the spring of 2010, the Raizen Group measured the instantaneous velocity of a Brownian particle in air. In 2014, they completed the same measurement in water and acetone. The velocity data was used to verify the Maxwell-Boltzmann velocity distribution, and the equipartition theorem for a Brownian particle.

These methods of controlling atoms were used by Raizen and collaborators to separate isotopes with high efficiency. The experiment demonstrated enrichment of lithium-7 to a purity over 99.95% in a single pass. The separation method is termed magnetically activated and guided isotope separation (MAGIS). One application of the work will be to produce enriched isotopes for medicine at a non-profit entity, The Pointsman Foundation, where Raizen serves as chairman of the board.

== Personal life ==
Raizen is married and resides in Austin and San Antonio, Texas. He is an advocate for historical preservation and animal rights.

== Awards and honors ==
- 2008: Willis Lamb Medal in Laser Science and Quantum Optics
- 2002: Max Planck Award from the Max Planck Society and the Alexander von Humboldt Foundation
- 1999: I.I. Rabi Prize in Atomic, Molecular, and Optical Physics, American Physical Society
- 1993-1998: National Science Foundation Young Investigator Award
- 1992-1995: Office of Naval Research Young Investigator Award
- 1992-1994: Alfred P. Sloan Foundation Research Fellow
- 1991-1993: The Sid W. Richardson Foundation Regents Chair Fellow
- 1989-1991: National Research Council Postdoctoral Fellowship
- 1988-: IBM Graduate Fellowship

Raizen is also a fellow of American Physical Society and the Optical Society of America.

== See also ==
- List of Jewish American physicists
- List of physicists
