= Delgo (disambiguation) =

Delgo may refer to:

- Delgo, Sudan
- Delgo (film), 2008 animated feature film
- Lior Delgo, investor, co-founder of VideoSurf
