= Olga Kirsch =

South African and Israeli poet (1924–1997)

- אולגה קירש
- Born: 23 September 1924; Koppies, Union of South Africa
- Died: 5 June 1997 (aged 72)
- Education: University of the Witwatersrand
- Occupation: Poet
- Spouse: Joseph Gillis (m. 1949)
- Writing career
- Genre: Poetry
- Notable works: Negentien Gedigte; Die Soeklig; The Book of Sitrya; Oorwinteraars in die Vreemde

Olga Kirsch (Hebrew: אולגה קירש; 23 September 1924 – 5 June 1997) was a South African and Israeli poet.

== Biography ==
Kirsch was born and brought up in Koppies in the then Orange Free State, South Africa. Her father had emigrated there from Lithuania and, though a Yiddish speaker, brought his daughter up to speak English, the mother tongue of her mother Eva, of British origin. She was the third in a family of five of three girls and two boys.

== Early years ==
While her primary and secondary education was mostly in Afrikaans, at the school in Koppies, she finished high school at the Eunice High School in Bloemfontein. Later, her family moved to Johannesburg, where she attended the University of the Witwatersrand to study medicine; but after one year of studies, she decided to study literature (Afrikaans and Dutch Literature and History). One of her teachers was the Afrikaans-language novelist C. M. van den Heever.

== Career ==
Kirsch wrote mostly in Afrikaans rather than English, publishing eight books of poetry in that language, as well as a volume of selected poems (she was only the second female Afrikaans poet to be published).

In 1948, at the age of 24, she emigrated to Israel and settled in Rehovot. She only returned to South Africa on three occasions: in 1975, 1979 and 1981. Her change of country influenced her writing and the language she used in her daily life, from Afrikaans to English and then to Hebrew. After her arrival to Israel, she taught English for a living, resumed studies and graduated in English literature at the Hebrew University of Jerusalem. In 1949, she married the British-born Israeli mathematician Joseph Gillis, professor at the Weizmann Institute of Science, with whom she had two daughters, Ada and Michal, born in 1950 and 1953, respectively.

Kirsch is the third female poet in Afrikaans to be published, after Sarah Goldblatt in 1921 and Elisabeth Eybers in 1936.

Kirsch's poetry was marked by metre and often by rhyme. In her first two books of poetry, Kirsch reflects her rejection of apartheid and her aspiration to live in Israel. As she matured, her poetry addresses more personal themes in sonnets dedicated to her husband, the mathematician Joseph Gillis. Other poems evoke the mourning of her mother and her granddaughter, who died at the age of nine due to an incurable illness. An accomplished linguist, she translated her poetry from Afrikaans into English and Hebrew. When unable to write, she would draw from nature, carve in wood, and embroider. Her sensitivity to nature affected her work in these media as well.

=== Works ===
The first of her seven books published in Afrikaans, Die soeklig (the projector) was written while she was still studying in South Africa and the second, Mure van die hart (Walls of the heart), in 1948, was written on the year of her departure for Israel. With the exception of a few poems in English in the Jewish Frontier, she did not publish anything after leaving South Africa.

Only about a quarter of a century later, in 1972, her third book was published, titled Negentien gedigte, (Nineteen poems), which Daniel Hugo refers as her "second beginning". In 1990, she published her first book of poetry in English. She continued to write in English, and was actively involved with the Israel Association of Writers in English. Though well known as a poet in South Africa, she failed to achieve the same degree of fame in Israel or the English-speaking world.

In the same way as Elisabeth Eybers, well before Breyten Breytenbach or Sheila Cussons, her life was marked by the exile and the difficulty of writing in Afrikaans away from South Africa. She remained a close friend of Elisabeth Eybers, and they visited each other in the Netherlands and Israel.

== Personal life ==
She was married to Joseph Gillis and had two daughters. She died on 5 June 1997, due to a brain tumor. Her legacy and career remains a source of interest in South Africa and abroad. Recently, her poetry has become the subject of a PhD thesis at the University of South Africa

== Legacy ==
In 2020, Egonne Roth, a South African writer based in Israel, published a biography of Olga Kirsch.

== Bibliography ==
Year links are to "[year] in poetry" articles:

- 1944: Die Soeklig (Johannesburg: J. L. van Schaik Bpk)
- 1948: Mure van die Hart (Johannesburg: Afrikaanse pers boekhandel)
- 1972: Negentien Gedigte (Kaapstad: Human & Rousseau)
- 1976: Geil Gebied (Kaapstad: Human & Rousseau)
- 1978: Oorwinteraars in die Vreemde (Kaapstad: Human & Rousseau)
- 1982: Afskeide (Kaapstad: Human & Rousseau)
- 1983: Ruie tuin (Kaapstad: Human & Rousseau)
- 1990: The Book of Sitrya (Rehovot: O. Kirsch)
