= Quantum-optical spectroscopy =

Generalization of laser spectroscopy in quantum optics

Quantum-optical spectroscopy is a quantum-optical generalization of laser spectroscopy where matter is excited and probed with a sequence of laser pulses.

Classically, such pulses are defined by their spectral and temporal shape as well as phase and amplitude of the electromagnetic field. Besides these properties of light, the phase-amplitude aspects have intrinsic quantum fluctuations that are of central interest in quantum optics. In ordinary laser spectroscopy, one utilizes only the classical aspects of laser pulses propagating through matter such as atoms or semiconductors. In quantum-optical spectroscopy, one additionally utilizes the quantum-optical fluctuations of light to enhance the spectroscopic capabilities by directly shaping and/or detecting the quantum fluctuations of light. Quantum-optical spectroscopy has applications in controlling and characterizing quantum dynamics of many-body states because one can directly access a large set of many-body states, which is not possible in classical spectroscopy.

== Quantum-optical state injection ==
A generic electromagnetic field can always be expressed in terms of a mode expansion where individual components form a complete set of modes. Such modes can be constructed with different methods and they can, e.g., be energy eigenstate, generic spatial modes, or temporal modes. Once these light mode are chosen, their effect on the quantized electromagnetic field can be described by Boson creation and annihilation operators $\hat{B}^\dagger$ and $\hat{B}$ for photons, respectively. The quantum fluctuations of the light field can be uniquely defined by the photon correlations $\Delta\langle\left [ B^ {\dagger}\right]^J\, B^K\rangle$ that contain the pure $(J+K)$-particle correlations as defined with the cluster-expansion approach. Using the same second-quantization formalism for the matter being studied, typical electronic excitations in matter can be described by Fermion operators for electronic excitations and holes, i.e.~electronic vacancies left behind to the many-body ground state. The corresponding electron–hole excitations can be described by operators $\hat{X}^\dagger$ and $\hat{X}$ that create and annihilate an electron–hole pair, respectively.

In several relevant cases, the light–matter interaction can be described using the dipole interaction

$\hat{H}_{\mathrm{lm}}=-\sum\mathcal{F}\,\hat{B}\hat{X}^{\dagger}+\mathrm{h.c.}\,,$

where the summation is implicitly taken over all possibilities to create an electron–hole pair (the $\hat{X}^\dagger$ part) via a photon absorption (the $\hat{B}$ part); the Hamiltonian also contains the Hermitian conjugate (abbreviated as h.c.) of the terms that are explicitly written. The coupling strength between light and matter is defined by $\mathcal{F}$.

When the electron–hole pairs are excited resonantly with a single-mode light $\hat{B}$, the photon correlations are directly injected into the many-body correlations. More specifically, the fundamental form of the light–matter interaction inevitably leads to a correlation-transfer relation

$\Delta\langle\left[\hat{X}^{\dagger}\right]^J\hat{X}^K\rangle=\eta^{\frac{J+K}{2}} \Delta\langle\left [ B^ { \dagger }\right]^JB^K\rangle\,,$

between photons and electron–hole excitations. Strictly speaking, this relation is valid before the onset of scattering induced by the Coulomb and phonon interactions in the solid. Therefore, it is desirable to use laser pulses that are faster than the dominant scattering processes. This regime is relatively easy to realize in present-day laser spectroscopy because lasers can already output femtosecond, or even attosecond, pulses with a high precision in controllability.

== Realization ==
Physically, the correlation-transfer relation means that one can directly inject desired many-body states simply by adjusting the quantum fluctuations of the light pulse, as long as the light pulse is short enough. This opens a new possibility for studying properties of distinct many-body states, once the quantum-optical spectroscopy is realized through controlling the quantum fluctuations of light sources. For example, a coherent-state laser is described entirely by its single-particle expectation value $\langle \hat{B} \rangle$. Therefore, such excitation directly injects property $\langle \hat{X} \rangle$ that is polarization related to electron–hole transitions. To directly excite bound electron–hole pairs, i.e., excitons, described by a two-particle correlation $\Delta \langle\hat{X}^\dagger \hat{X} \rangle$, or a biexciton transition $\Delta \langle \hat{X}\, \hat{X} \rangle$, one needs to have a source with $\Delta\langle \hat{B}^\dagger \hat{B} \rangle$ or $\Delta \langle \hat{B} \hat{B} \rangle$ photon correlations, respectively.

To realize quantum-optical spectroscopy, high-intensity light sources with freely adjustable quantum statistics are needed which are currently not available. However, one can apply projective methods to access the quantum–optical response of matter from a set of classical measurements. Especially, the method presented by Kira, M. et al is robust in projecting quantum-optical responses of genuine many-body systems. This work has shown that one can indeed reveal and access many–body properties that remain hidden in classical spectroscopy. Therefore, the quantum-optical spectroscopy is ideally suited for characterizing and controlling complicated many-body states in several different systems, ranging from molecules to semiconductors.

== Relation to semiconductor quantum optics ==
Quantum-optical spectroscopy is an important approach in general semiconductor quantum optics. The capability to discriminate and control many-body states is certainly interesting in extended semiconductors such as quantum wells because a typical classical excitation indiscriminately detects contributions from multiple many-body configurations; With quantum-optical spectroscopy one can access and control a desired many-body state within an extended semiconductor. At the same time, the ideas of quantum-optical spectroscopy can also be useful when studying simpler systems such as quantum dots.

Quantum dots are a semiconductor equivalent to simple atomic systems where most of the first quantum-optical demonstrations have been measured. Since quantum dots are man-made, one can possibly customize them to produce new quantum-optical components for information technology. For example, in quantum-information science, one is often interested to have light sources that can output photons on demand or entangled photon pairs at specific frequencies. Such sources have already been demonstrated with quantum dots by controlling their photon emission with various schemes. In the same way, quantum-dot lasers may exhibit unusual changes in the conditional probability to emit a photon when already one photon is emitted; this effect can be measured in the so-called g^{2} correlation. One interesting possibility for quantum-optical spectroscopy is to pump quantum dots with quantum light to control their light emission more precisely.

Quantum-dot microcavity investigations have progressed rapidly ever since the experimental demonstration of vacuum Rabi splitting between a single dot and a cavity resonance. This regime can be understood on the basis of the Jaynes–Cummings model while the semiconductor aspects provide many new physical effects due to the electronic coupling with the lattice vibrations.

Nevertheless, the quantum Rabi splitting—stemming directly from the quantized light levels—remained elusive because many experiments were monitoring only the intensity of photoluminescence. Following the ideology of quantum-optical spectroscopy, Ref. predicted that quantum-Rabi splitting could be resolved in photon-correlation measurement even when it becomes smeared out in photoluminescence spectrum. This was experimentally demonstrated by measuring the so-called g^{2} correlations that quantify how regularly the photons are emitted by the quantum dot inside a microcavity.

== See also ==
- Photon antibunching
- Resonance fluorescence
- Semiconductor Bloch equations
- Semiconductor luminescence equations
- Ultrafast laser spectroscopy
