= Richard Todd (disambiguation) =

Richard Todd (1919–2009) was an Irish-British actor.

Richard Todd may also refer to:

- Richard D. Todd (1951–2008), American psychiatrist
- Richard Todd (American football) (born 1953), American football player
- Richard Todd (horn player), American horn player
- Richard Copeland Todd, pioneer from Chester, South Carolina

== See also ==
- Dick Todd (disambiguation)
