= Joseph Buxbaum =

American neuroscientist

Joseph D. Buxbaum
- Education: Touro College; Weizmann Institute of Science
- Scientific career
- Fields: Neuroscience
- Workplaces: Rockefeller University; Icahn School of Medicine
- Doctoral advisor: Yadin Dudai
- Other academic advisors: Paul Greengard

Joseph D. Buxbaum is an American molecular and cellular neuroscientist, autism researcher, and the Director of the Seaver Autism Center at the Icahn School of Medicine at Mount Sinai. Buxbaum is also, along with Simon Baron-Cohen, the co-editor of the BioMed Central journal Molecular Autism, and is a member of the scientific advisory board of the Autism Science Foundation. Buxbaum is a Professor of Psychiatry, Neuroscience, and Genetics and Genomic Sciences. He is also the Vice Chair for Research and for Mentoring in the Department of Psychiatry at the Icahn School of Medicine at Mount Sinai.

== Education ==
Buxbaum received his BSc in Math and Biology from Touro College (New York, NY) in 1980. In 1983, he received his MSc in Neurobiology from the Weizmann Institute of Science (Rehovot, Israel), where he also received his PhD in Neurobiology in 1988 under Yadin Dudai. Buxbaum completed a Postdoctoral Fellowship in Molecular and Cellular Neuroscience at the Rockefeller University (New York, NY) in 1991 in Paul Greengard's group.

== Research ==
Buxbaum's research focuses on using genetic and functional methods to identify and characterize genes and pathways involved in autism, schizophrenia, and Alzheimer disease. His research focuses on common and rare genetic variation in neuropsychiatric disorders and has been an early leader in rare genetic variation in psychiatry. With the advent of massively parallel sequencing, this focus on rare variation is now providing profound insights into many neuropsychiatric disorders, including autism, intellectual disability, schizophrenia, bipolar disorder, and Alzheimer disease.

In Alzheimer disease, Buxbaum has conducted several cell-biological and patient-based analyses of APP and A-beta and he and his group continue to do genetic and functional analyses in Alzheimer disease.

In schizophrenia, Buxbaum and his colleagues pioneered early molecular research into white matter/oligodendrocyte abnormalities, and they continue to examine molecular changes in this disorder using large brain cohorts and animal models.

Buxbaum's research in autism has shown that genetic risk includes rare and common variation as well as de novo and inherited variation. Buxbaum is the founder and co-Principal Investigator of the Autism Sequencing Consortium (ASC), an international group of scientists who share autism samples, data, and ideas in order to accelerate the understanding of the causes and treatments of autism. The ASC is the largest whole-exome sequencing study in autism, with over 22,000 samples analyzed to date.

Buxbaums research also extends into cell and animal models. His group has an extensive functional genomics laboratory using yeast two hybrid, cultured cells, and rodent and other animal models in neuropsychiatric disorders. Functional studies in his laboratory have led to pathway discovery in autism, schizophrenia and Alzheimer disease, to more than a dozen animal models, and to a clinical trial showing preliminary efficacy in patients with a SHANK3 mutation.

Buxbaum has published over 250 peer-reviewed articles that have garnered more than 30,000 citations, with 216 papers having 10 or more citations.

== Awards ==
Buxbaum has received numerous awards for his research. He is a Fellow of the American College of Neuropsychopharmacology (ACNP) and received both their basic and clinical research awards (the Daniel E. Efron Award, for "outstanding basic research contributions to neuropsychopharmacology" in 2005 and the Joel Elkes International Award, "in recognition of an outstanding clinical contribution to neuropsychopharmacology" in 2010). In 2008, he received recognition from the Eden Institute Foundation for his "commitment and dedication to improving the quality of life in individuals with autism." In 2010, Buxbaum received the Richard D. Todd Memorial Award from the International Society of Psychiatric Genetics for "outstanding contribution to the genetics of child psychiatry." He has been recognized by the NYU Child Study Center (2004), the UC Davis/MIND Institute (2011), and the Autism Spectrum News (2014 Leadership Award) for his work on the causes and treatment of ASD. Buxbaum received departmental and school-wide awards from Touro College for his BSc, the Wolf Prize and recognition from the Israeli government for his PhD, the James A. Shannon Director's Award from the NIH when he began as an independent faculty member, and the Dean's Award for Excellence in Translational Science from Mount Sinai. In 2015, Buxbaum was elected into the National Academy of Medicine, formerly the Institute of Medicine.
