= Athénée Robert Catteau =

School in Brussels, Belgium

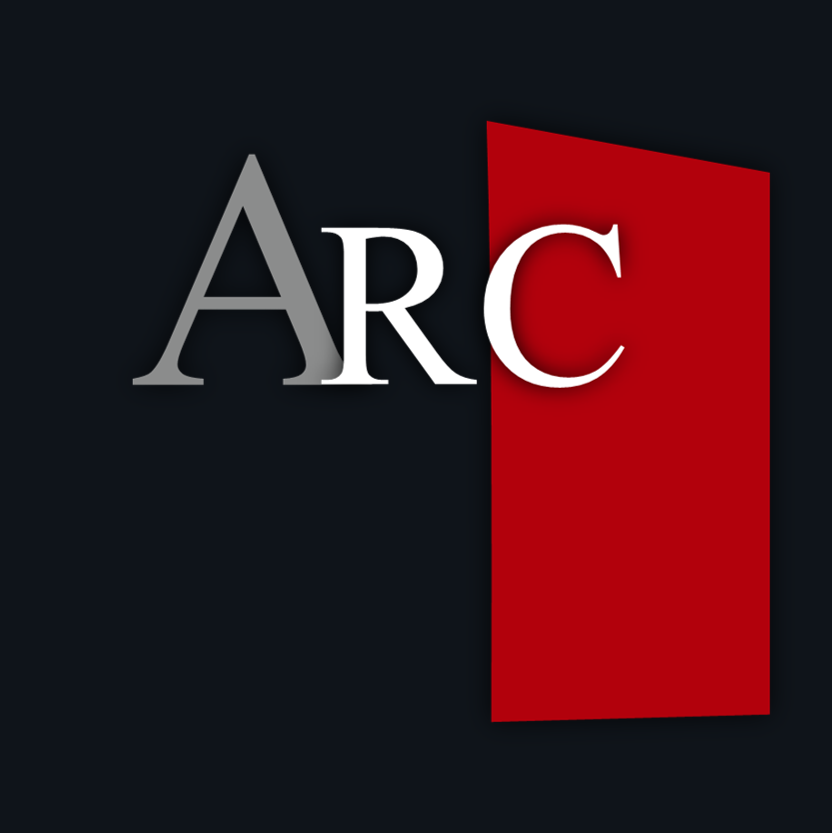
- Logo since 2013

Location
- 49 Ernest Allard street Brussels; Brussels, 1000; Belgium
- Coordinates: 50.8388°N 4.3534°E

Information
- School type: State subsidized public schools, Public school
- Founded: 1851
- Oversight: City of Brussels
- Principal: Laurent Genot
- Headmistress: Evelyne Gotto
- Employees: 74 (2017)
- Enrolment: 694
- Classes offered: Latin-Greek, Latin-Sciences, Latin-Mathematics, Science-Mathematics, Economy-Mathematics
- Language: French
- Colours: Grey, white and red
- School fees: Free
- Website: robertcatteau.be

The Athénée Robert Catteau (ARC) is a French-language secondary school owned by the City of Brussels, located on rue Ernest Allard, part of the subsidized public schools network enseignement officiel. Since 1948, it holds the name of Robert Catteau, an attorney, journalist and alderman of the City of Brussels. The original name of the school was École moyenne A, founded in 1851 within the Free University of Brussels. The school provides modern general education preparing for university studies and qualifies itself as a "center of excellence".

== History ==
The building of the École moyenne A, in Art Deco style, took place from 1923 to 1927 between the Church of Saints-Jean-et-Étienne-aux-Minimes and the Palace of Justice, following plans of architect François Malfait.

The ancient convent of the Minimes, built on the house of Renaissance anatomist Andreas Vesalius, had been decommissioned in 1790, and served successively as a deposit of begging in 1801, a tobacco factory in 1813, a lithography workshop in 1815, a military hospital and finally a women's prison before being destroyed in 1920. Malfait had to contend with the height difference and the strict height limit of the buildings to preserve the panorama of the Poelaert square located above. The new buildings of the École moyenne A were inaugurated on 27 September 1927. On 7 December 1948, the school became the Athénée Robert Catteau.

In 1948, the upper grades comprised three classical orientations: the Latin-Greek, Latin-Mathematics and Latin-Sciences sections (created in 1947). A Scientific A section was created in 1951 and a seventh secondary preparatory grade to higher education in 1958. The Athénée opened to girls in 1978. In 2011, sections were restructured in order to adapt to other establishments in the Brussels-Capital Region. The Latin-Greek, Latin-Mathematics and the Latin-Sciences final orientations remained unchanged, but Scientific A became Mathematics-Sciences and a new finality was added: the Economy-Mathematics section.

On 1 January 2016, Evelyne Gotto replaced André Possot as head of the athenaeum.

== Architecture ==
The building is built of light colored brick, in the geometric spirit of Art Deco, with decorative elements of red brick and white stone for the sculptures and the large cornice in cavet that crowns the top of the building.

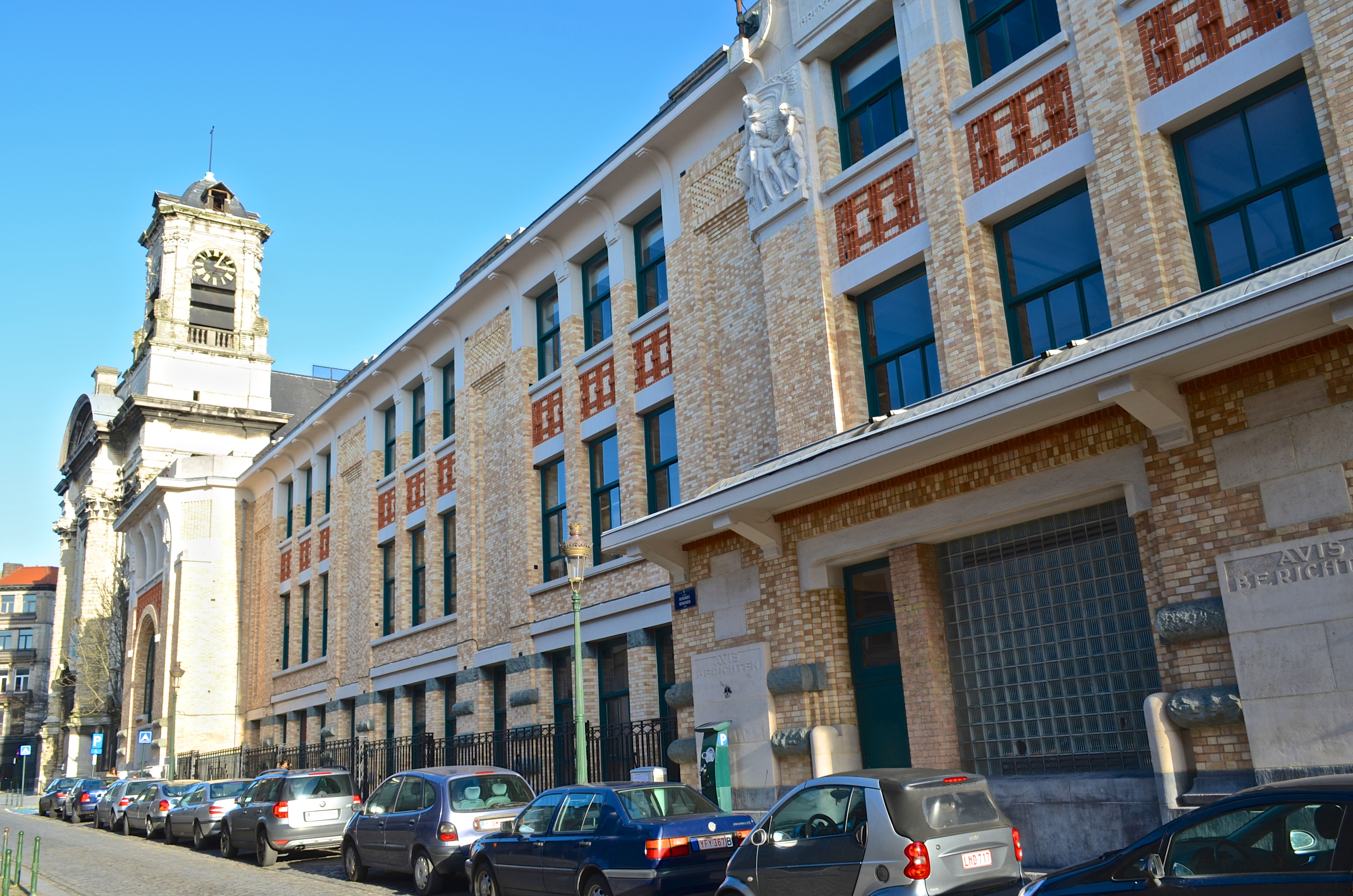
The Athénée Robert Catteau and the Minimes Church

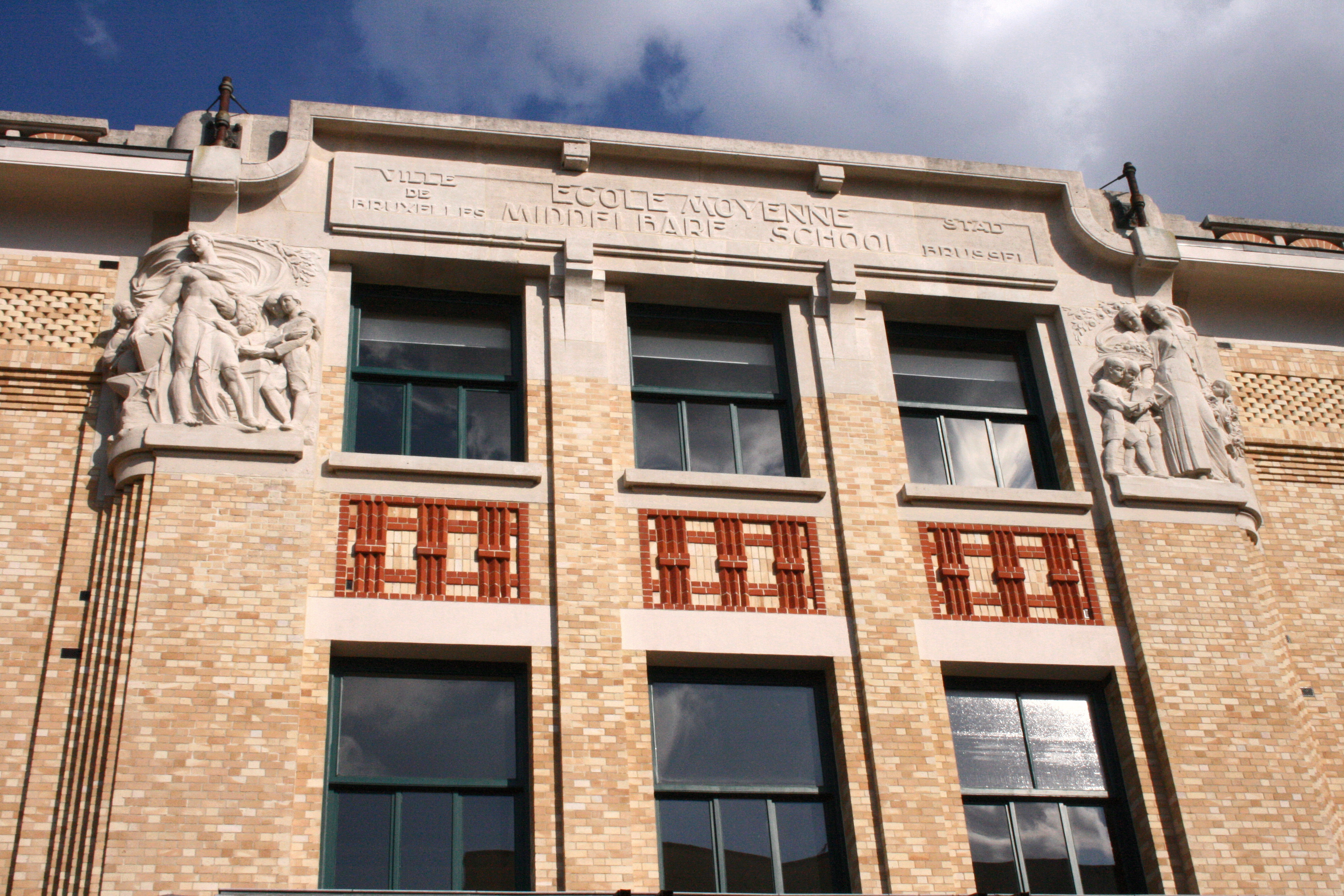
Façade, corps piece

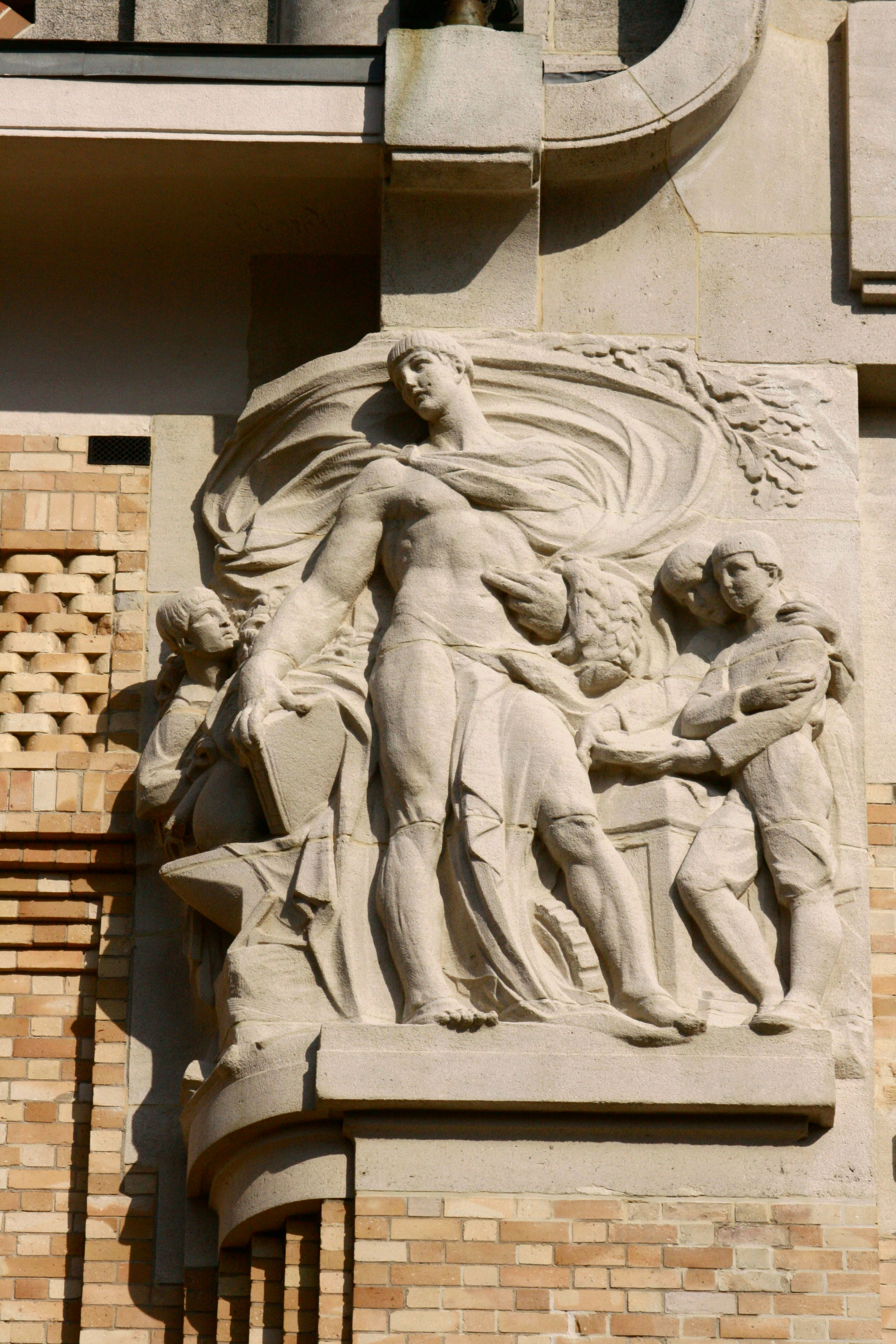
Sculpture of the façade

== Educational system ==
The school offers a traditional (non-renovated) education which has the reputation of being demanding and rigorous. For example, it emphasizes the study of ancient languages and is strongly centered on theoretical sciences and mathematics.

The Athénée is a public school following the curriculum of the City of Brussels public school system, and furthermore is part of the Enseignement officiel network of the Fédération Wallonie-Bruxelles.

The complementary 7th secondary grade prepares students, mainly coming from other secondary schools or other countries, to Polytechnic, Medicine or Science faculties, as well as to the Royal Military Academy.

== Notable alumni ==
- Christopher Gérard (Belgian writer)
- Daniel Zajfman (Israeli-Belgian physicist; president of the Weizmann Institute)
- Denis Wirtz (Vice Provost for Research and Theophilus Halley Smoot Professor of Engineering Science at Johns Hopkins University)
- Jean-Baptiste Pietersz (first director, knight of the Order of Leopold)
- Jean Dierickx (linguist, professor at the Université libre de Bruxelles)
- Jean-Philippe Toussaint (Belgian writer and filmmaker)
- Léopold Blondiau (Belgian politician, vice-president of the Red Cross, first president of the Cercle des Anciens de l'Ecole Moyenne A in 1907)
- Philippe Moureaux (Belgian politician, Minister of State)
- Robert Frickx aka. Robert Montal (Belgian author and literature historian, member of the Royal Academy of French Language and Literature of Belgium)
- Serge Moureaux (Belgian politician, senator and federal congressman)

In 2015, Alessandro Telo, who graduated the previous year, undergoes a small media wave for his ability to master 28 languages.

== See also ==
- Art Deco in Brussels
- Education in Belgium
