= De Shalit High School =

Coordinates: 31°53′57.62″N 34°48′59.44″E

- Rehovot; Israel

Information
- Type: Public
- Established: 1943
- Principal: Avi Kish
- Grades: 7–12
- Enrollment: 2,300
- Website: www.deshalit.co.il

De Shalit High School Complex is a high school located in Rehovot, Israel. The school was named after physicist Amos de-Shalit (1926–1969).

De Shalit has an enrollment of 2,000 students, from Rehovot and Kiryat Ekron. The school is affiliated with the Weizmann Institute of Science and many of its students participate in science-related projects organized by the Davidson Institute of Science Education.

== See also ==
- Education in Israel
- Science and technology in Israel
