= Uzi Dayan =

Israeli politician

- עוזי דיין
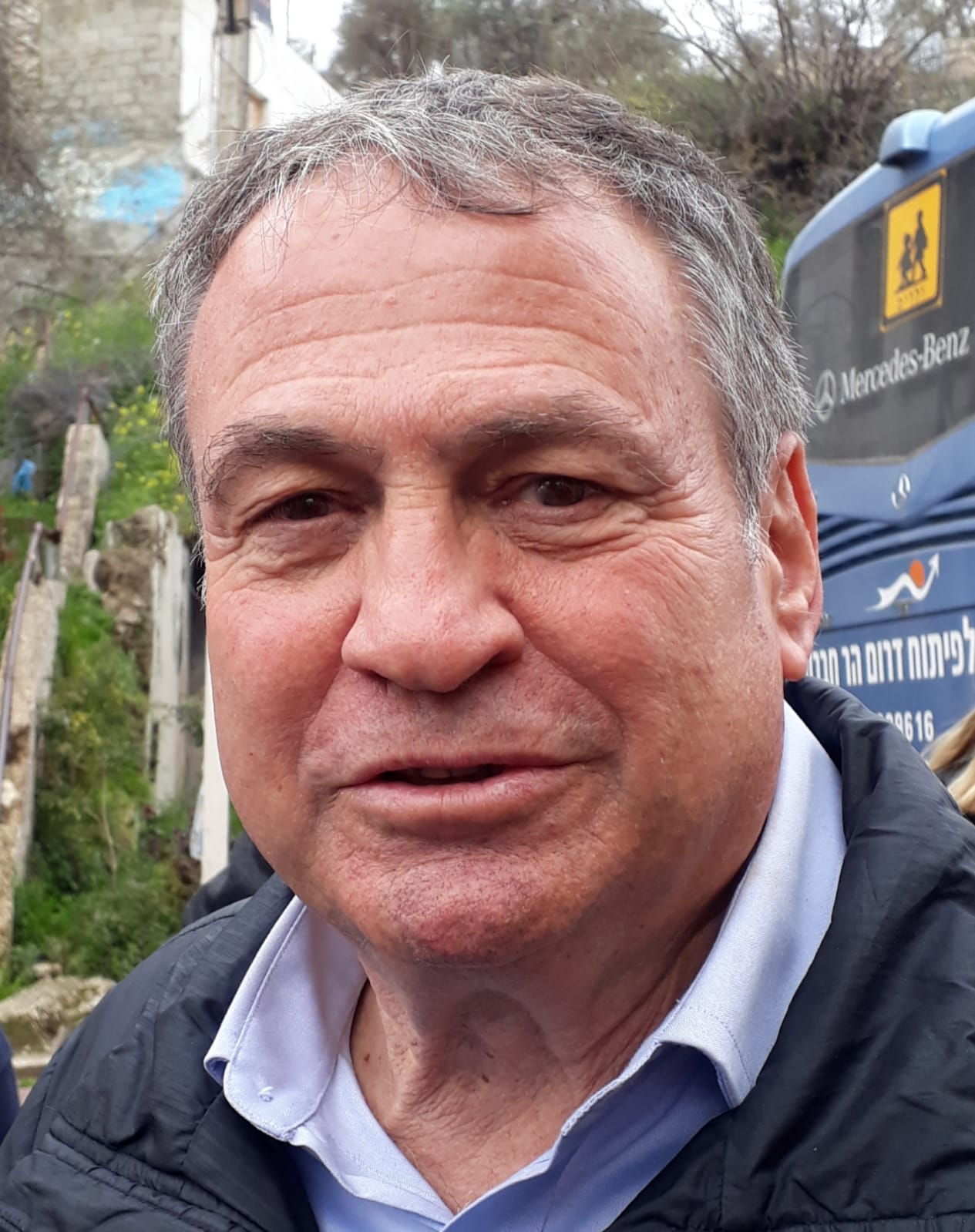
- Uzi Dayan in 2019

2nd National Security Advisor (Israel)
- In office September 2000 – September 2002
- Preceded by: David Ivri
- Succeeded by: Ephraim Halevi

Faction represented in the Knesset
- 2019: Likud
- 2020–2021: Likud

Personal details
- Born: 4 January 1948 (age 78) Mandatory Palestine
- Party: Likud

Military service
- Allegiance: Israel
- Branch/service: Israel Defense Force
- Years of service: 1966–2002
- Rank: Major General
- Battles/wars: Yom Kippur War; Lebanese Civil War: 1982 Lebanon War; South Lebanon conflict (1985–2000); Second Intifada

Aluf (Major General, res.) Uzi Dayan (Hebrew: עוזי דיין; born January 4, 1948) is a former general in the Israel Defense Forces and an Israeli politician. He served as a member of the Knesset for Likud from 2020 to 2021.

== Biography ==
Uzi Dayan is a nephew of Moshe Dayan, grandson of Shmuel Dayan and cousin of Assi Dayan, Yael Dayan and Yehonatan Geffen. His father, Zorik, was killed in the Battle of Ramat Yohanan in April of the year he was born. His mother Mimi remarried in March 1950 after having met Moshe Rabinovitch in Rome the previous summer. They had two children of their own, Dan (b. 1951) and Michal (b. 1956). Dayan was raised in HaYogev.

Dayan was an undergraduate at Hebrew University of Jerusalem, where he studied under Robert Aumann and received a B.Sc. in mathematics and physics. He subsequently studied at Stanford University, earning an M.Sc. in operations research.

Dayan is married to Professor Tamar Dayan, the daughter of Professor Igal Talmi. They have three children: one son called Itai and two daughters called Aviva and Zohar. They reside in Kokhav Ya'ir.

== Military career ==
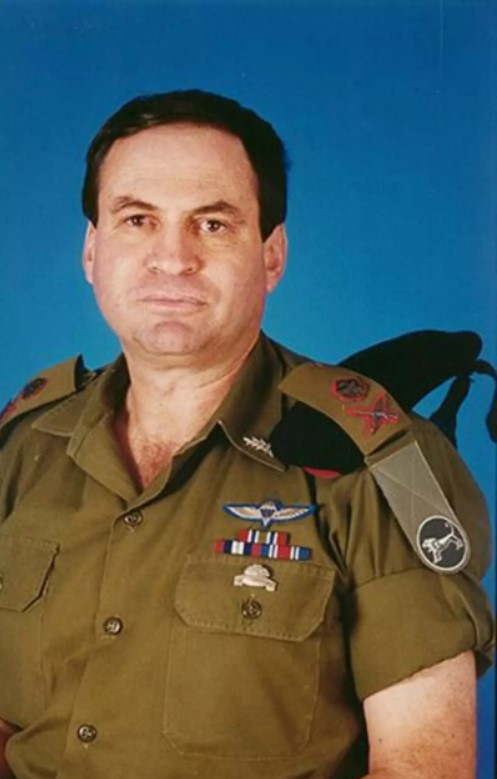
Uzi Dayan in 2000

Dayan served in the Sayeret Matkal from 1966 to 2002 and became commander of the unit. He served as head of Central Command, Deputy Chief of Staff, and headed the Israeli National Security Council (2000–2002). He was a member and later head of an elite commando unit that reportedly made eight to ten attempts to assassinate Yasser Arafat.

== Political career ==
Dayan was a founder of the Tafnit party which ran in the 2006 legislative elections. In mid-2008, the party joined Likud.
