= Eliezer Huberman =

American scientist

Eliezer Huberman is an American scientist who is the founder, scientific director, and CEO of Novadrug LLC, a Chicago-based pharmaceutical firm . He is currently an adjunct professor in the College of Pharmacy at the University of Illinois.

Huberman's fields of interest include cancer research, cellular differentiation and adult stem cell research.

== Education and early career ==
Huberman received a Master of Science in Clinical Microbiology from Tel-Aviv University (1960-1964) and a Ph.D. in Genetics from the Weizmann Institute of Science (1965-1969). During 1969-1971, Huberman was a Post-Doctoral Fellow at the University of Wisconsin and mentored by the late Professor Charles Heidelberger. In 1968 and 1971 Huberman was a visiting scientist at the U.S. National Cancer Institute.

From 1976 to 1981, Huberman was a senior scientist in the biology division at the U.S. Oak Ridge National laboratory. Prior to this, he was a scientist at the Weizmann Institute, where in time he became a tenured Associate Professor in the Department of Genetics.

Huberman immigrated to the United States, with his family in 1976 to accept an appointment as a cancer researcher at t Oak Ridge. Five years later, he took a senior research position at the U.S. Department of Energy’s Argonne National Laboratory in Lemont, Illinois. There, from 1981 to 1999, Huberman served as Division Director for Biological Research and from 1999 to 2006 as a distinguished Argonne Fellow. He was also a professor at the University of Chicago (1982-1997) in the departments of Microbiology, Molecular Genetics & Cell Biology, and Radiation & Cellular Oncology.

== Current work ==
In 2006, Huberman cofounded Novadrug. He and his team focus their research on developing broad spectrum anti-viral drugs. Novadrug received an NIH grant totalling $245, 000 in 2010 for the development of novel anti-hepatitis C virus drugs from the qualifying therapeutic discovery project program. Huberman holds numerous patents, most recent being a patent for a drug that treats Hepatitis C, but is also promising in the treatment of both Ebola and Marburg disease for which Novadrug has an ongoing collaboration with the U.S. Army. Novadrug has several other patents pending approval.

== Academic activities ==
Huberman has published over 200 scientific papers in journals and currently serves as an associate editor of Molecular Carcinogenesis. He was an associate editor of other scientific journals, including Cancer Research, Carcinogenesis and Muagenesis, Molecular and Cellular Differentiation, and Teratogenensis, Pharmacology and Therapeutics. In addition, he is the co-organizer of the ongoing series of the International Charles Heidelberger Symposia on Cancer Research.

Huberman holds various patents including a series involving 5’-monophosphate dehydrogenase, a target for the antiviral drug ribavirin, as well as one involving a class of drugs that in vitro are effective against human hepatitis C, immunodeficiency, corona and Ebola viruses.

== Advisory and committee work ==
Huberman served on various national and international advisory and review committees including, the U.S. National Academy of Sciences, Environmental Protection agency, Leukemia Research foundation, Massachusetts Institute of Technology, International Agency for Research on Cancer (WHO), Moscow’s Engelhardt Institute of Molecular Biology, National Cancer Institute, and National Institute for Environmental Health. He also served as the Chairman and member of the Scientific Advisory Board for Pharmafrontiers Corporation later, renamed as Opexa Corporation.

Currently, he is a board member of the Charles and Patricia Heidelberger Foundation for Cancer Research and the American Committee for the Weizmann Institute of Science Midwest region.

== Distinctions ==
Huberman is the recipient a visiting professorship at Japan’s Kobe University (2000/2001), an Honorary Doctorate from the Russian Academy of Sciences Engelhardt Institute of Molecular Biology (1997) (10), commendation from the Japanese Society of Pediatric Oncology (1992), Prime Minister Nakasone and University of Tokyo Fellowships for Cancer Research (1986). 2023 will be the 24th symposium, hosted in Chile. Renowned scientists from around the world will attend. In 2022 a biography of Dr. Huberman's life, written by Ellen Brazer, was published.

== Family life ==
Huberman is a Holocaust survivor. He was born in Poland in 1939 and moved to Israel in 1950 where he met his wife Lily Huberman (née Ginzburg). They married in 1967 and have two sons. His younger brother is former director of the Mossad, Meir Dagan.
