= Tafnit =

Tafnit תפנית
- Leader: Uzi Dayan
- Dissolved: 2008
- Merged into: Likud
- Ideology: Centrism; Anti-corruption
- Political position: Centre

Election symbol
- פ

Tafnit (Hebrew: תפנית Turnaround) was an Israeli political party and a social movement established by the Aluf in reserve Uzi Dayan.

== History ==
Tafnit was established as a social movement. On 25 December 2005 Dayan announced that the movement would run in the 2006 Knesset elections as an anti-corruption party. However, the party received just 0.6% of the vote, failing to cross the 2% electoral threshold.

Tafnit merged into Likud when Dayan joined the party in mid-2008.
