= Michal Irani =

Israeli computer scientist

- מיכל איראני
- Education: Hebrew University of Jerusalem (PhD)
- Scientific career
- Workplaces: Weizmann Institute of Science
- Thesis: Multiple Motions in Image Sequences - Analysis and Applications (1994)
- Doctoral advisor: Shmuel Peleg
- Website: www.weizmann.ac.il/math/irani//

Michal Irani (Hebrew: מיכל איראני) is a professor in the Department of Computer Science and Applied Mathematics at the Weizmann Institute of Science, Israel.

== Education ==
Irani received her Ph.D. degree in computer science from the Hebrew University of Jerusalem. Subsequently, she was a member of the Vision Technologies Laboratory at the Sarnoff Research Center (Princeton).

== Research ==
Irani's research is in the area of computer vision, image processing, and artificial intelligence. In particular, she has done work on understanding the internal statistics of natural images and videos, the space-time analysis of videos, and on visual inference by composition.

== Selected awards ==
- 2020 Rothschild Prize in Mathematics/Computer Sciences and Engineering
- 2017 Helmholtz Prize for the paper "Actions as space-time shapes"
- 2016 Maria Petrou Prize (awarded by the International Association in Pattern Recognition) for outstanding contributions to the fields of Computer Vision and Pattern Recognition
- 2003 Morris L. Levinson Prize in Mathematics
- 2000, 2002 ECCV Best Paper Awards
