= Amos de-Shalit =

Israeli physicist (1926–1969)

- עמוס דה-שליט
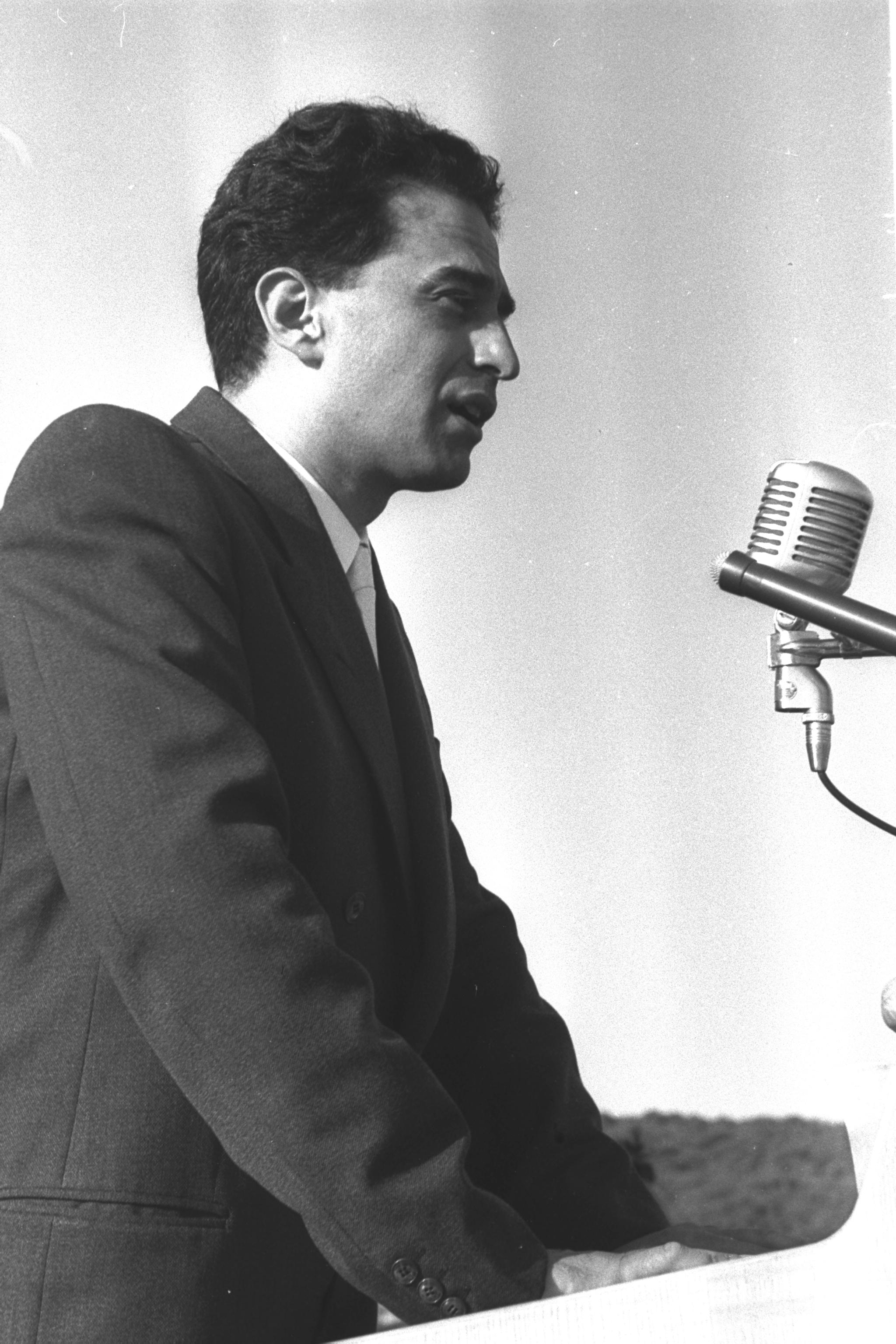
- Born: September 29, 1926; Jerusalem, British Mandate of Palestine (now Israel)
- Died: September 2, 1969 (aged 42); Rehovot, Israel
- Education: Hebrew University of Jerusalem; ETH Zurich
- Known for: Nuclear Shell Model
- Scientific career
- Fields: Nuclear Physics
- Workplaces: Weizmann Institute of Science

Amos de-Shalit (Hebrew: עמוס דה-שליט; September 29, 1926 – September 2, 1969) was an Israeli nuclear physicist and Israel Prize laureate.

== Biography ==
Amos de-Shalit was born in Jerusalem in the British Mandate of Palestine (now Israel). He grew up in Tel Aviv and graduated from Gymnasia Balfour. In 1949, de-Shalit earned his master's degree in physics at the Hebrew University of Jerusalem under the guidance of Giulio Racah. During the 1947–1949 Palestine war, he served in the IDF Science Corps. De-Shalit and his fellow students wrote a letter to Israeli Prime Minister David Ben-Gurion to point out the vital importance of nuclear physics for Israel's future. In 1951, he earned his doctorate from the ETH Zurich in Switzerland.

De-Shalit died before his 43rd birthday from acute pancreatitis. He was married to Nechama. Their sons, Ehud and Avner are professors of mathematics and political science, respectively, at the Hebrew University of Jerusalem. De-Shalit's sister, Tamar, was married to Arthur Goldreich.

== Academic and scientific career ==
From 1952 to 1954, he was a research fellow at Princeton University and Massachusetts Institute of Technology and spent some time at the Saclay Atomic Research Institute in France.

In 1954, de-Shalit was asked to establish the Department of Nuclear Physics at the Weizmann Institute of Science, which he headed for ten years. While working at the Weizmann Institute, he also served as a consultant to the Israel Ministry of Defense.

In 1957/58 de-Shalit spent a sabbatical year at CERN as a Ford Foundation Fellow.

From 1961 to 1963, de-Shalit served as science director of the Weizmann Institute and from 1966 to 1969, he served as the institute's Chief Executive/General Manager.

== Awards and recognition ==
- In 1962, de-Shalit was elected as a member of the Israel Academy of Sciences and Humanities.
- In 1965, he was awarded the Israel Prize in exact sciences, together with his colleague Professor Igal Talmi, for their work on "shell model" in nuclear physics.
- The De Shalit High School and two junior sister high schools in Rehovot were renamed after him.
- In 1974, In conjunction with the Weizmann Institute, the "Amos de-Shalit Foundation" was founded to foster an increased awareness of the important role of science among Israeli youth, and "Amos de-Shalit Summer School program" was launched in his name.

== Published works ==
- Nuclear Shell Theory, co-author Igal Talmi (1963) Academic Press, (reprinted by Dover Publications)
- Theoretical Nuclear Physics: Nuclear Structure v. 1, Amos de-Shalit (Author), Herman Feshbach (Author) John Wiley and Sons

== See also ==
- List of Israel Prize recipients
