= Alon Chen =

Israeli neuroscientist

- אלון חן
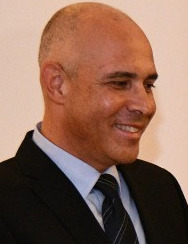
- Born: 1970 (age 55–56); Israel
- Education: Ben-Gurion University of the Negev (BSc, MBA); Weizmann Institute of Science (PhD)
- Occupation: neuroscientist
- Employer: Weizmann Institute of Science
- Title: President
- Predecessor: Daniel Zajfman

Alon Chen (Hebrew: אלון חן; born 1970) is an Israeli neuroscientist and the 11th President of the Weizmann Institute of Science.

== Biography ==
Chen was born in Israel. He is a neuroscientist.

He attended Ben-Gurion University of the Negev (BSc in life sciences, magna cum laude, 1995, and MBA, 2001), and the Weizmann Institute of Science (PhD, magna cum laude, 2001). On a Rothschild scholarship and a Fulbright scholarship, Chen conducted postdoctoral research at the Salk Institute for Biological Studies in San Diego, California, from 2001 to 2005.

In 2005 Chen returned to the Weizmann Institute of Science as a senior scientist in the Neurobiology Department and received an Alon Fellowship from the Israel Council for Higher Education. In 2012, he became an associate professor, and in 2017 a full professor.

In 2013, Chen was appointed a director in the Max Planck Institute of Psychiatry, and head of the joint Weizmann-Max Planck Laboratory for experimental neuropsychiatry and behavioral neurogenetics. He heads the Neurobiology Department at the Weizmann Institute of Science, and is an adjunct professor at LMU Munich's Faculty of Medicine.

Chen is the 11th President of the Weizmann Institute of Science. He took office in December 2019, succeeding Daniel Zajfman.

His research includes an investigation of the biological brain processes that regulate and are activated by mental stress and anxiety. This includes an investigation by Chen of brain mechanisms that are connected to anxiety, depression, eating disorders, and metabolic syndromes.

Chen is a member of the Executive Advisory Board of the World.Minds Foundation, engaging with leaders on topics at the intersection of science, health, and society.
