= Seaver Autism Center =

Medical research center in New York, New York, US

Seaver Autism Center for Research and Treatment
- Formation: 1993
- Location: Icahn School of Medicine at Mount Sinai
- Director: Joseph Buxbaum, Ph.D.
- Website: Seaver Autism Center

The Seaver Autism Center for Research and Treatment at Icahn School of Medicine at Mount Sinai conducts research studies and provides care to children and adults with autism spectrum disorder (ASD). The Seaver Autism Center works to understand the biological causes of ASD and to develop treatments, as well as provide education and training opportunities.

As a collaborative effort that integrates the fields of psychiatry, psychology, neurology, molecular genetics, neuroscience, and neuroimaging, the Center receives funding from diverse sources, including the National Institutes of Health (NIH) in addition to multiple foundations and the pharmaceutical industry. The Center receives over 600 new referrals each year and 100 contacts per month, including patients enrolled in ongoing treatment.

== History ==
The Seaver Autism Center was founded in 1993 by a grant to the Icahn School of Medicine at Mount Sinai from the Beatrice and Samuel A. Seaver Foundation. The Foundation was established in 1984 and created exclusively for charitable, scientific, literary, and educational endeavors.

== Leadership ==
- Director: Joseph Buxbaum, PhD
- Clinical Director: Alex Kolevzon, MD
- Chief Psychologist: Paige M. Siper, PhD
- Director of Community Outreach: Michelle Gorenstein-Holtzman, PsyD
- Director of Psychology Training: Danielle B. Halpern, PsyD

== Research ==
Members of the research team participate in interrelated ASD research programs in genetics, experimental therapeutics, neuroimaging, and cognitive neuroscience. Researchers publish over 40 related articles per year in peer-reviewed journals. The Center uses methods of genetic epidemiology, molecular and cell biology, genetics, and animal models to identify genes that contribute to ASD susceptibility and use that knowledge to develop novel therapeutics.

The Seaver Autism Center offers an integrated series of clinical research studies in treatments, genetics, and brain imaging. All services provided as part of research studies are free of charge to eligible participants and can include gold standard diagnostic assessments such as the Autism Diagnostic Observation Schedule – Second Edition (ADOS-2), the Autism Diagnostic Interview-Revised (ADI-R), psychiatric evaluations, and neuropsychological testing.

== Clinical Services ==
The Center provides comprehensive clinical services, including but not limited to psychiatric evaluations and Autism Diagnostic Observation Schedules (ADOS). These services are provided free-of-charge to people with autism, with participation in a research study. The Center also provides support and training for parents and siblings of individuals with autism.
