= Israel Dostrovsky =

Israeli scientist

- ישראל דוסטרובסקי
- Born: November 29, 1918; Odessa, Ukrainian People's Republic
- Died: September 28, 2010 (aged 91)
- Education: University College London
- Known for: Fifth president of the Weizmann Institute of Science, laureate of the 1995 Israel Prize in the exact sciences
- Awards: Weizmann Prize (1951); Israel Prize (1995)
- Scientific career
- Fields: Radioactive isotopes, Director-General of the Israel Atomic Energy Commission
- Workplaces: Weizmann Institute of Science

Israel Dostrovsky (Hebrew: ישראל דוסטרובסקי; November 29, 1918 – September 28, 2010) was a Ukrainian-born Israeli physical chemist, fifth president of the Weizmann Institute of Science, laureate of the 1995 Israel Prize in the exact sciences.

== Early years ==
Israel Dostrovsky was born in Odessa, in 1918 and immigrated to Eretz-Israel as a baby with his parents in 1919, aboard the ship “Ruslan”. His father, world-renowned dermatologist Arieh Dostrovsky, became a founder of Hebrew University's medical school and of the Hadassah hospital. His first cousin, Yaacov Dori (born Yakov Dostrovsky) became the first IDF Chief of Staff.

As a 13-year-old science whiz, he volunteered as a signaler for the Haganah, the corps that was later to become the Israel Defense Forces, clambering up mountains to send military messages across the country with light-reflecting mirrors. He also belonged to a pioneering youth group that established the kibbutz Maoz Haim, but it was obvious to all he would be more useful to the country as a scientist. After attending the Gymnasia high school in Jerusalem, he earned a B.Sc. in chemistry in 1940 and a Ph.D. in physical chemistry in 1943, both from University College London.

== Career ==
After working as a lecturer in chemistry at University College in North Wales for five years, Dostrovsky returned to Israel, joining the Weizmann Institute of Science in Rehovot in 1948, shortly before the institute's dedication. The institute's five scientific departments were to be headed by world-class scientists from various countries, but just then the War of Independence broke, and only two of the appointed scientific leaders dared to move to Israel. Dostrovsky, then only 30, filled one of the three vacant leadership positions: he was appointed Head of the Isotope Research Department, a post he held for 17 years.

In the late 1940s, he established a semi-industrial facility separating oxygen isotopes in water, on the Weizmann Institute's campus. It produced water enriched with the heavy oxygen isotope (heavy-oxygen water and more commonly known as heavy water but not to be confused with the more common heavy water with Hydrogen atoms replaced with 2 Deuterium atoms) commonly used in medical diagnostic procedures. He conducted research in several areas and was mentor to generations of young scientists

When the Israel Atomic Energy Commission was established in 1953, Dostrovsky became its first Director of Research; from 1965 to 1971, he served as its Director-General.

Upon returning to the Weizmann Institute, he was appointed Vice President and, two years later, elected fifth President of the Institute, a position he held for three years. In 1975, he was named Institute Professor. Turning his attention to the subject of water, he served as Chairman of Israel's Desalination Committee from 1966 to 1981. Global disillusionment in the nuclear power spurred him on to an interest in renewable sources of energy. He placed the need to exploit solar energy for diverse purposes on the Weizmann Institute and national agenda. Returning later to the basic aspects of nuclear reactions, he and his colleagues represented Israel at GALLEX, an experiment conducted by an international team in an underground laboratory in Italy’ Gran Sasso region, with the aim of measuring the flux of neutrinos, fundamental particles that reach the earth from the core of the sun. On the international scene, he served as a member of the Scientific Advisory Committee of the United Nations’ International Atomic Energy Agency in Vienna (1973-1981) and was a member of the Executive Committee of the International Energy Agency's SolarPACES project (1991-1993).

His prizes and honors include the Ramsey Medal and Prize, 1943; Tel Aviv's Weizmann Prize, 1952; honorary doctorates from Tel Aviv University, 1973, and the Technion – Israel Institute of Technology, 1994; and the Israel Prize, 1995. He was a member of the Israel Academy of Sciences and Humanities and an honorary life member of the New York Academy of Science. He was elected a Fellow of the American Physical Society in 2003.
