= Daniel Zajfman =

Israeli physicist (born 1959)

- דניאל זייפמן
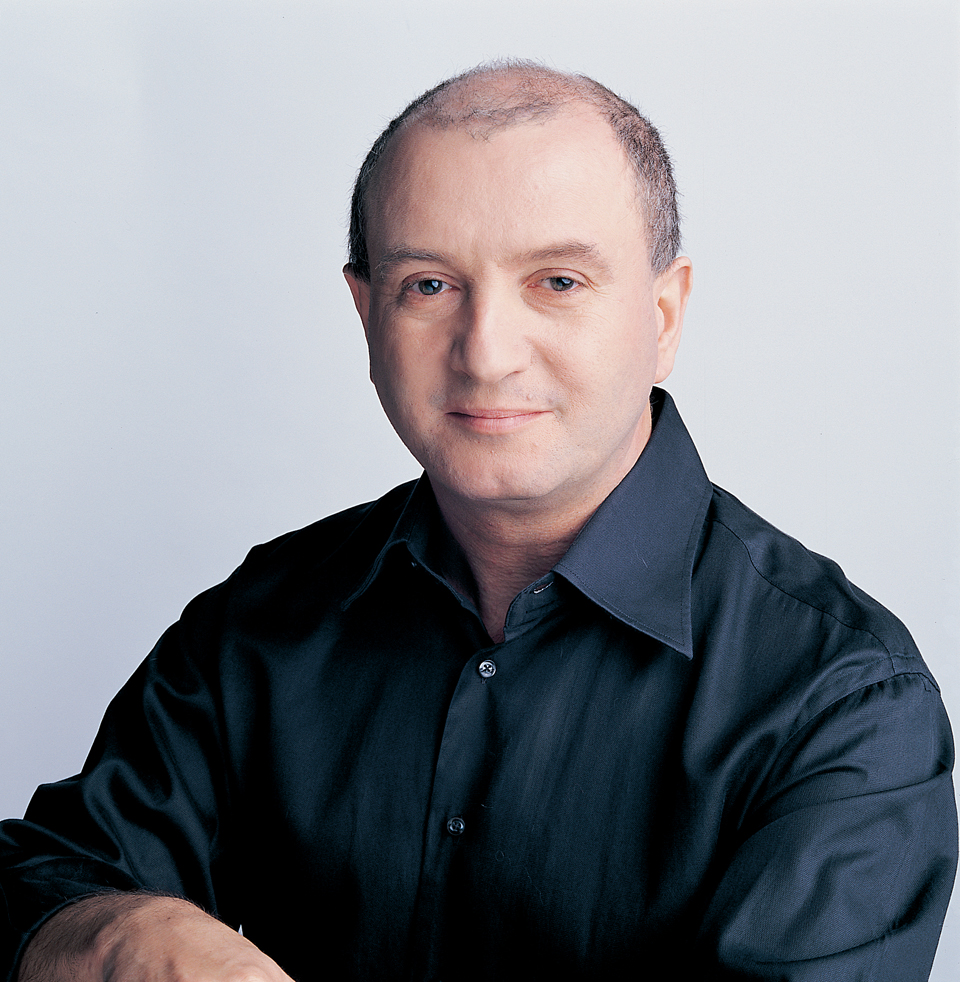
- Born: June 7, 1959 (age 67); Brussels, Belgium
- Citizenship: Israel
- Education: Technion – Israel Institute of Technology
- Known for: tenth president of the Weizmann Institute
- Awards: Guttwirth Prize, Levinson Prize in Experimental Physics, Emilio Segrè award, The Minerva Award Lecture, The Harnack Medal
- Scientific career
- Fields: Physics
- Workplaces: Weizmann Institute

Daniel Zajfman (Hebrew: דניאל זייפמן; born June 7, 1959) is an Israeli physicist whose main research interests are centered on the physics of simple molecular ions. On December 1, 2006, he was elected as the tenth president of the Weizmann Institute.

== Early life ==
Daniel Zajfman was born in Brussels, Belgium. He joined the Hashomer Hatzair movement while studying at the Athénée Robert Catteau. In 1979 he emigrated to Israel where he met his wife, Joëlle Hayoun. In 1983 he graduated in Physics (B.Sc.), at the Technion, Israel Institute of Technology, Haifa. He continued his studies at the Technion and in 1989 received his PhD, in atomic physics. He conducted his post-doctoral at the Argonne National Laboratory, Illinois, United States. (1989–1991)

== Career ==
In 1991 he returned to Israel and began his career as a senior scientist at the Dept. of Particle Physics (Weizmann Institute of Science). In 1997, he was appointed Associate Professor and was promoted to full professor in 2003. Since 2001, he has been an external member of the Max Planck Institute for Nuclear Physics in Heidelberg, Germany, and in 2005, he was appointed as a Director at this Max Planck Institute.

On December 1, 2006, he was elected as the tenth president of the Weizmann Institute, the youngest ever. He was in turn succeeded in 2019 by Alon Chen.

On January 1, 2020, he was elected as the Chair of the Academic Board of the Israel Science Foundation.

In 2023 he received the Harnack Medal. for his contributions to the advancement of science and German-Israeli cooperation

In 2025, he was awarded the Prize for Understanding and Tolerance.

== Research and patents ==
His research focuses on the reaction dynamics of small molecules and how they influence the composition of the interstellar medium. He recreates the conditions of outer space in the laboratory using special devices called 'ion traps' or 'storage rings'. In these devices, he is able to briefly store and measure the properties of small amounts of material, as little as a few hundred atoms or molecules-worth, under the extreme conditions of interstellar space (especially very low temperatures and low densities). Some of his research has focused on the puzzle of how complex molecules are formed in outer space.

=== Patents ===
- A Device for Three dimensional Imaging
- A new method for Mass Spectrometry
