= Molecular Autism =

- Language: English
- Edited by: Simon Baron-Cohen, Joseph Buxbaum

Publication details
- History: 2010–present
- Publisher: BioMed Central
- Frequency: Upon acceptance
- Open access: Yes
- License: Creative Commons Attribution
- Impact factor: 6.5 (2022)

Standard abbreviations
- ISO 4: Mol. Autism

Indexing
- CODEN: MAOUBR
- ISSN: 2040-2392
- OCLC no.: 526673687

Links
- Journal homepage; Online access

Molecular Autism is a peer-reviewed open-access medical journal covering research on the cause, biology, and treatment of autism and related neurodevelopmental disorders.

The journal was established in 2010 and is published by BioMed Central. The editors-in-chief are Simon Baron-Cohen (University of Cambridge) and Joseph Buxbaum (Mount Sinai School of Medicine).

== Abstracting and indexing ==
The journal is abstracted and indexed in:

- Biological Abstracts
- BIOSIS Previews
- Chemical Abstracts Service
- MEDLINE/PubMed
- Science Citation Index Expanded
- Scopus
