= Yadin Dudai =

Israeli neuroscientist

- ידין דודאי
- Born: 8 December 1944 (age 81); Tel Aviv, Israel
- Education: Weizmann Institute of Science, California Institute of Technology
- Known for: learning and memory
- Scientific career
- Fields: Neuroscience
- Workplaces: Weizmann Institute of Science
- Doctoral students: Joseph Buxbaum

Yadin Dudai (Hebrew: ידין דודאי; born December 8, 1944) is a neuroscientist, Professor (emeritus) of Neurobiology at the Weizmann Institute of Science in Rehovot, Israel, and the Albert and Blanche Willner Family Global Distinguished Professor of Neural Science at New York University (NYU).

== Life ==
Dudai was born in Tel Aviv, Israel to a family most of which was murdered in the Holocaust in Lithuania and Poland.

After working as a professional journalist and news editor for a leading Israeli daily, and reading philosophy and middle eastern studies at Tel-Aviv University, he switched to study biochemistry and genetics, with supplements in modern history, at the Hebrew University of Jerusalem. He received his B.Sc. (with honor) from the Hebrew University and his Ph.D. from the Weizmann Institute of Science, where he studied protein chemistry and biophysics, and conducted his postdoctoral studies at the California Institute of Technology, where he was on Seymour Benzer's team that pioneered the neurogenetic analysis of memory mechanisms.

Over the years he has been a Scholar in Residence at the National Institutes of Health, and a visiting professor at Columbia University, Harvard University, Yale University, University of Edinburgh, Collège de France, Boston University, and New York University (NYU). He served in a number of academic and public positions, including an advisor to the President of the State of Israel and to the National Council of R&D, a member of the Planning and Grants Committee of the Universities in Israel, Dean of the Faculty of Biology and Chair of the Department of Neurobiology and head of the Brain Research Centers at the Weizmann Institute of Science. He is also the Scientific Director of the Israel Center of Research Excellence (I-CORE) in the cognitive sciences.

== Research ==
Yadin Dudai's research interests encompass the neurobiology of learning and memory, memory as a concept and as a brain faculty, and the interrelationships among the two. He is also interested in collective memory, and in the evolution of 'cultural organs', such as the cinema.

He has contributed to our understanding of brain and behavioral mechanisms of learning and memory, particularly those related to the consolidation and persistence of the memory trace, and of the evolution and role of concepts of memory in science and culture at large.

Among the contributions made by Yadin Dudai and his coworkers: identification of the first learning mutant, using Drosophila, which was a critical proof of concept for the neurogenetic analysis of memory; discovery of consolidation in the fruit fly, rendering it amenable to genetic analysis and demonstrating the universality of consolidation; dissociation of the effect of single gene mutations on encoding vs. consolidation; elucidation of the molecular machinery of memory encoding, memory consolidation and experimental extinction in the mammalian neocortex, using taste associations as a model; discovery of the rule that guides stability of associative memories after their retrieval (the "dominant trace" model); and the data-driven hypothesis that consolidations linger long after they have been considered to end, accounting for ongoing changes in the stability and veracity of memory.

He has over 210 professional publications in the field of brain and memory.

While he is mostly known for his work on learning and memory, he is also one of the founders of the field of neurogenetics of behavioural plasticity when he was in the group of Seymour Benzer.

== Awards and honors ==
Dudai received the IPSEN Prize 2013 for outstanding achievements in memory research, together with Richard Morris and Timothy Bliss. He was elected member of EMBO in 2014 and the same year became a member of the Israel Academy of Sciences and Humanities, of which he is chairing the Science Division since 2019. In 2013, Dudai became a Fellow of the American Association for the Advancement of Science.

== Selected books ==
- Dudai, Y (1989) The Neurobiology of Memory: Concepts, Findings, Trends. Oxford: Oxford University Press ISBN 0-19-854229-1
- Dudai, Y (2002) Memory from A to Z, keywords, concepts and beyond. Oxford: Oxford University Press. ISBN 0-19-850267-2
- Kandel, ER, Dudai, Y and Mayford, MR (eds.) (2016) "Learning and Memory". NY: Cold Spring Harbor Press. ISBN 9781621821601

== See also ==
- Seymour Benzer
