= Igal Talmi =

Israeli nuclear physicist (1925–2026)

- יגאל תלמי
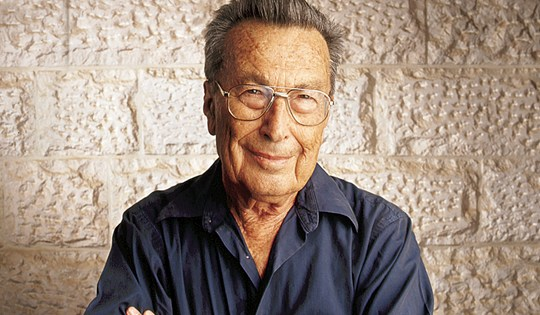
- Talmi in 2003
- Born: 31 January 1925; Kyiv, Ukrainian SSR, USSR
- Died: 4 February 2026 (aged 101); Kokhav Ya'ir–Tsur Yig'al, Israel
- Citizenship: Israeli
- Education: Hebrew University; ETH Zurich
- Known for: Nuclear shell model
- Awards: Weizmann Prize (1961)
- Scientific career
- Fields: Nuclear physics
- Workplaces: Weizmann Institute of Science
- Doctoral advisor: Wolfgang Pauli

Igal Talmi (Hebrew: יגאל תלמי; 31 January 1925 – 4 February 2026) was an Israeli nuclear physicist.

== Background ==
Igal Talmi was born on 31 January 1925 in Kiev, Ukraine, then part of the Soviet Union. His family immigrated to Mandate Palestine later that year and settled in Kfar Yehezkel. After graduating from Gymnasia Herzliya in Tel Aviv in 1942, he joined the Palmach.

In 1947, Talmi completed his master's degree in physics at the Hebrew University of Jerusalem, writing his M.Sc. thesis under the guidance of Giulio Racah. In 1949, he earned his doctorate at the ETH Zurich in Switzerland under Wolfgang Pauli. From 1952 to 1954, he was a research fellow at Princeton University, where he worked with Eugene Wigner.

Igal was married to Chana (Kivelewitz). They had two children: a son, Prof. Yoav P. Talmi, M.D., a head and neck neurosurgeon; and a daughter, Prof. Tamar Dayan, a zoologist who is married to General (Aluf) Uzi Dayan. Igal Talmi died on 4 February 2026, at the age of 101.

== Scientific career ==
In 1954, Talmi joined the Weizmann Institute of Science where he became Professor of Physics in 1958. Talmi was one of the founders of the Department of Nuclear Physics at the Weizmann Institute. He served as the Head of the Nuclear Physics Department (1967–1976), and the Dean of the Faculty of Physics (1970–1984). Talmi spent sabbatical years at Princeton, Stanford, Massachusetts Institute of Technology (MIT), Yale and other universities as a visiting professor.

Talmi was a member of the Israel Academy of Sciences and Humanities from 1963, and was the Chairman of the Division of Sciences from 1974 to 1980. He also served on the Israel Atomic Energy Commission.

In addition to his influential papers and conference talks, Talmi also wrote two books that served as guides and companions to generations of nuclear structure theorists. The first, written with the late Amos de-Shalit, was a veritable bible of shell theory and the second, written some 30 years later, continued the tradition of being an exhaustive compendium of relevant results and derivations.

=== Nuclear physics research ===
Talmi's main field of research was the theory of nuclear structure. The atomic nucleus can be composed of a large number of protons and neutrons which move due to strong interactions between them. In spite of their complexity, nuclei exhibit some simple and regular features. Most importantly, nuclei behave as if they move independently in a common static potential well. This gives rise to the existence of shells of protons and neutrons much like the electronic shells in atoms. Nuclei whose proton and neutron shells are complete have special stability and the numbers of protons and of neutrons in them are called magic numbers. This picture of the nucleus is called the nuclear shell model. To calculate energies of nuclear states it is necessary to know the exact form of the forces which act between the nuclear constituents. These are still not sufficiently known even after many years of research. Talmi developed a method to obtain the information from experimental data and use it to calculate and predict energies which have not been measured. This method has been successfully used by many nuclear physicists and has led to deeper understanding of nuclear structure. The theory which gives a good description of these properties was developed. This description turned out to furnish the shell model basis of the elegant and successful interacting boson models. Talmi also participated in the study of explicit fermion–boson mappings required to connect the interacting-boson model with its shell-model roots and in the introduction of the boson F-spin analog to nucleon isospin.

== Awards and recognition ==
- In 1962, awarded the Weizmann Prize of Tel Aviv Municipality.
- In 1965, awarded the Israel Prize in exact sciences, together with his colleague Professor Amos de-Shalit, for their work on "shell model" in nuclear physics.
- In 1971, received the Rothschild Prize.
- In 1972, elected Fellow of the American Physical Society.
- In 2000, awarded the Hans Bethe Prize of the American Physical Society.
- In 2003, received the EMET Prize, presented by the prime minister of Israel.

== Published works ==
- Nuclear Shell Theory, co-author Amos de-Shalit (1963) Academic Press, (reprinted by Dover Publications)
- Simple Models of Complex Nuclei: The Shell Model and the Interacting Boson Model (1993) Harwood Academic Publishers

== See also ==
- List of Israel Prize recipients
