= Dick Todd =

Dick Todd may refer to:

- Dick Todd (American football) (1914–1999), NFL player and coach
- Dick Todd (ice hockey), former junior hockey coach
- Dick Todd (singer) (1914–1973), Canadian singer

== See also ==
- Richard Todd (disambiguation)
