= Joseph Gillis =

British-Israeli mathematician

Joseph E. Gillis
- יוסף גיליס
- Born: 3 August 1911; Sunderland, Great Britain
- Died: 18 November 1993 (aged 82); Rehovot, Israel
- Education: Cambridge University
- Spouse: Olga Kirsch
- Awards: 1951 Weizmann Prize
- Scientific career
- Fields: Mathematics
- Workplaces: Weizmann Institute of Science
- Doctoral advisor: Abram Samoilovitch Besicovitch
- Notable students: Achi Brandt

Joseph E. Gillis (Hebrew: יוסף גיליס; 3 August 1911 – 18 November 1993) was a British-Israeli mathematician and one of the founders of the Faculty of Mathematics at the Weizmann Institute of Science, where he served as a professor of Applied Mathematics. He made notable contributions to fractal sets, fluid dynamics, random walks, and pioneered the combinatorial theory of special functions of mathematical physics.

== Career ==
Gillis was born on 3 August 1911 in Sunderland, in the north east of England. He studied at Trinity College, Cambridge, completing his doctoral thesis on "Some Geometrical Properties of Linearly Measurable Plane Sets of Points" under A.S. Besicovitch in 1935. During World War II he worked in Bletchley Park as a cryptographer. He taught maths at Queen's University Belfast between 1937 and 1947.

In 1948 he immigrated to Israel and joined the Weizmann Institute of Science (then the Ziv Institute), where he became a founding member of the Department of Applied Mathematics. During the Academic Year 1954-1955 he visited the Institute for Advanced Study as part of the Electronic Computer Project headed by John von Neumann. He was very active in advancing mathematics education, and chaired the department of Science Teaching at the Weizmann Institute. He also started the Israel Mathematics Olympiad and coached the Israeli team for many years, as well as edited mathematics periodicals for high school students and amateurs.

== Personal life ==
He was married to Olga Kirsch and had two daughters. He died on 18 November 1993.
