= Achi Brandt =

Israeli mathematician

Achiezer Brandt
- אחי ברנד
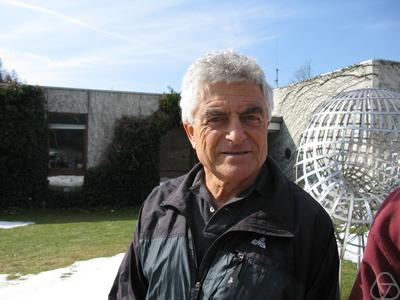
- Achi Brandt at Oberwolfach in 2009
- Born: 1938 (age 87–88); Givat Brenner, Israel
- Education: Weizmann Institute of Science
- Known for: Multigrid methods
- Awards: Landau Prize (1978), Rothschild Prize (1990), SIAM/ACM Prize in Computational Science and Engineering (2005)
- Scientific career
- Fields: Mathematics
- Workplaces: Weizmann Institute of Science, Courant Institute of Mathematical Sciences, Stanford University
- Doctoral advisor: Joseph Gillis

Achiezer Brandt (Hebrew: אחי ברנד; born 1938 in Givat Brenner, today in Israel) is an Israeli mathematician, noted for his pioneering contributions to multigrid methods.

== Background ==
Achi Brandt earned his Ph.D. degree at the Weizmann Institute of Science in 1965, under the supervision of Joseph Gillis, with a thesis on numerical methods in hydrodynamics and magnetohydrodynamics. He is a faculty member of the Weizmann Institute, and has taught at several universities in the United States, including the Courant Institute of Mathematical Sciences and Stanford University.

He is the chief scientist and co-founder (along with Lior Delgo, Eitan Sharon, and Shai Deljo) of VideoSurf, a video-search technology startup, backed by Al Gore. Microsoft Corp bought the company in 2011.

== Awards ==
He was the recipient of the Landau Prize in Mathematics in 1978 and the Rothschild Prize in Mathematics in 1990. In 2005, he won the SIAM/ACM Prize in Computational Science and Engineering for "pioneering modern multilevel methods, from multigrid solvers for partial differential equations to multiscale techniques for statistical physics, and for influencing almost every aspect of contemporary computational science and engineering".
