= Richard D. Todd =

American psychiatrist

- Born: 1951; Oklahoma
- Died: August 22, 2008 (aged 56–57)
- Education: Vanderbilt University; University of Texas at Dallas; University of Texas at San Antonio
- Spouse: Karen O'Malley
- Children: Lucas F. Todd; Anne M. O'Malley
- Awards: Elaine Schlosser Lewis Award from the American Academy of Child and Adolescent Psychiatry (2008)
- Scientific career
- Fields: Child and adolescent psychiatry Psychiatric genetics
- Institutions: Washington University in St. Louis
- Thesis: The Structure and Organization of Nucleosomes in Chromatin (1977)
- Doctoral advisor: William T. Garrard Jr.

Richard D. Todd (1951 – August 22, 2008) was an American psychiatrist who served as the Blanche F. Ittleson Professor of Psychiatry and director of the Division of Child and Adolescent Psychiatry at Washington University School of Medicine in St. Louis, Missouri. He specialized in the genetic and environmental causes of child and adolescent psychiatric disorders, such as attention-deficit hyperactivity disorder and autism. Born in Oklahoma, he was educated at Vanderbilt University, the University of Texas at Dallas, and the University of Texas at San Antonio. He died of leukemia on August 22, 2008. At the time of his death, he was a member of the editorial board of the academic journal Biological Psychiatry, which published an obituary for him.
