= Rabi splitting =

Energy level splitting due to strong light-matter coupling

Rabi splitting is the separation of a single resonance into two distinct energy or frequency modes when a light field strongly couples to a matter excitation, such as an atom, exciton, magnon, or qubit. It is considered a hallmark of the strong coupling regime in light-matter interaction.

== Overview ==
When a confined electromagnetic mode (for example, in an optical or microwave cavity) interacts weakly with a material excitation, the system exhibits a single broadened resonance. However, in the strong coupling regime, the photon mode and the matter excitation hybridize to form two new eigenmodes. These hybrid modes are separated in frequency, and the energy difference between them is called the Rabi splitting.

The phenomenon can be observed in cavity quantum electrodynamics, exciton-polariton systems, circuit quantum electrodynamics, magnon-photon coupling, and plasmon-exciton systems.

== Theoretical description ==
In a simple two-mode coupled system described by coupled mode theory or the Jaynes–Cummings model, the Rabi splitting at resonance is given by:

$$\Omega_R = 2g$$

where:

- $\Omega_R$ is the Rabi splitting,
- $g$ is the coupling strength between the light and matter modes.

In realistic systems with dissipation, strong coupling occurs when the coupling strength exceeds the combined loss rates of the system. A commonly used criterion is:

$$g > \frac{\kappa + \gamma}{4}$$

where:

- $\kappa$ is the cavity decay rate,
- $\gamma$ is the decay rate of the material excitation.

== Avoided crossing ==
Rabi splitting is often identified experimentally through an avoided crossing in dispersion relations. When the frequencies of the uncoupled photon and matter modes are tuned into resonance, instead of crossing, the modes repel each other and form two separated branches. The minimum frequency gap at resonance corresponds to the Rabi splitting.

== Vacuum Rabi splitting ==
When the splitting arises due to interaction with the vacuum electromagnetic field (in the absence of externally injected photons), the phenomenon is known as vacuum Rabi splitting. This effect is central to cavity quantum electrodynamics and demonstrates the quantized nature of the electromagnetic field.

== See also ==
- Rabi oscillation
- Strong coupling
- Polaritons
