= Weizmann Institute of Science =

Public university and research institute in Rehovot, Israel

Coordinates: 31°54′27″N 34°48′33″E

- מכון ויצמן למדע (Hebrew)
- Former name: Daniel Sieff Research Institute (1934–1949)
- Type: Public research
- Established: 1934
- Founder: Chaim Weizmann
- Endowment: US$600.427 M (2019)
- President: Alon Chen
- Faculty: 952
- Administrative staff: 400
- Students: 1,700 (2025)
- Postgraduates: 500 (2025)
- Doctoral students: 750 (2025)
- Location: Rehovot, Israel
- Campus: Urban
- Postdoctoral fellows: 450 (2025)
- Website: www.weizmann.ac.il

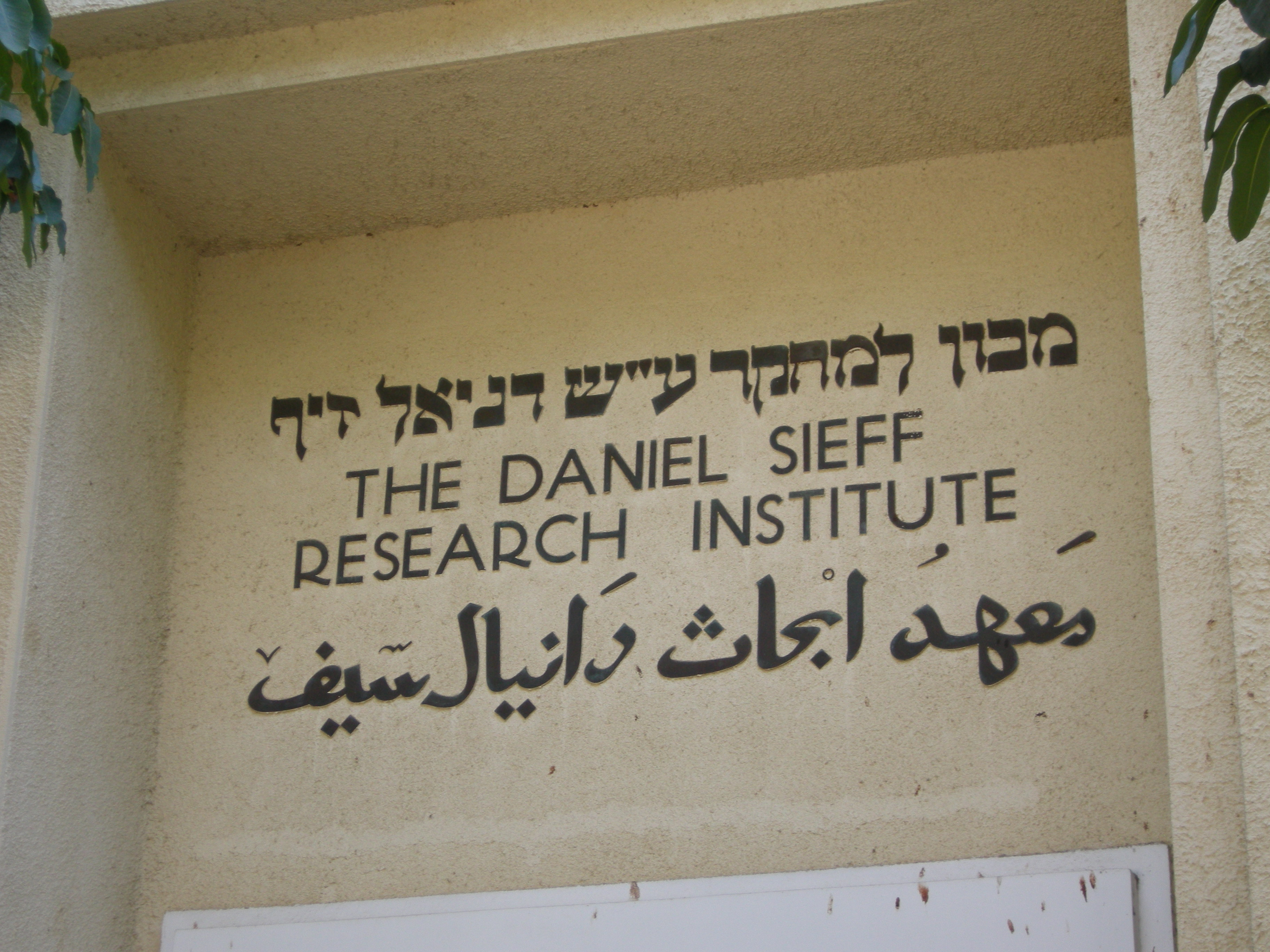
The front door of the administrative building with the Institute's first name, The Daniel Sieff Research Institute

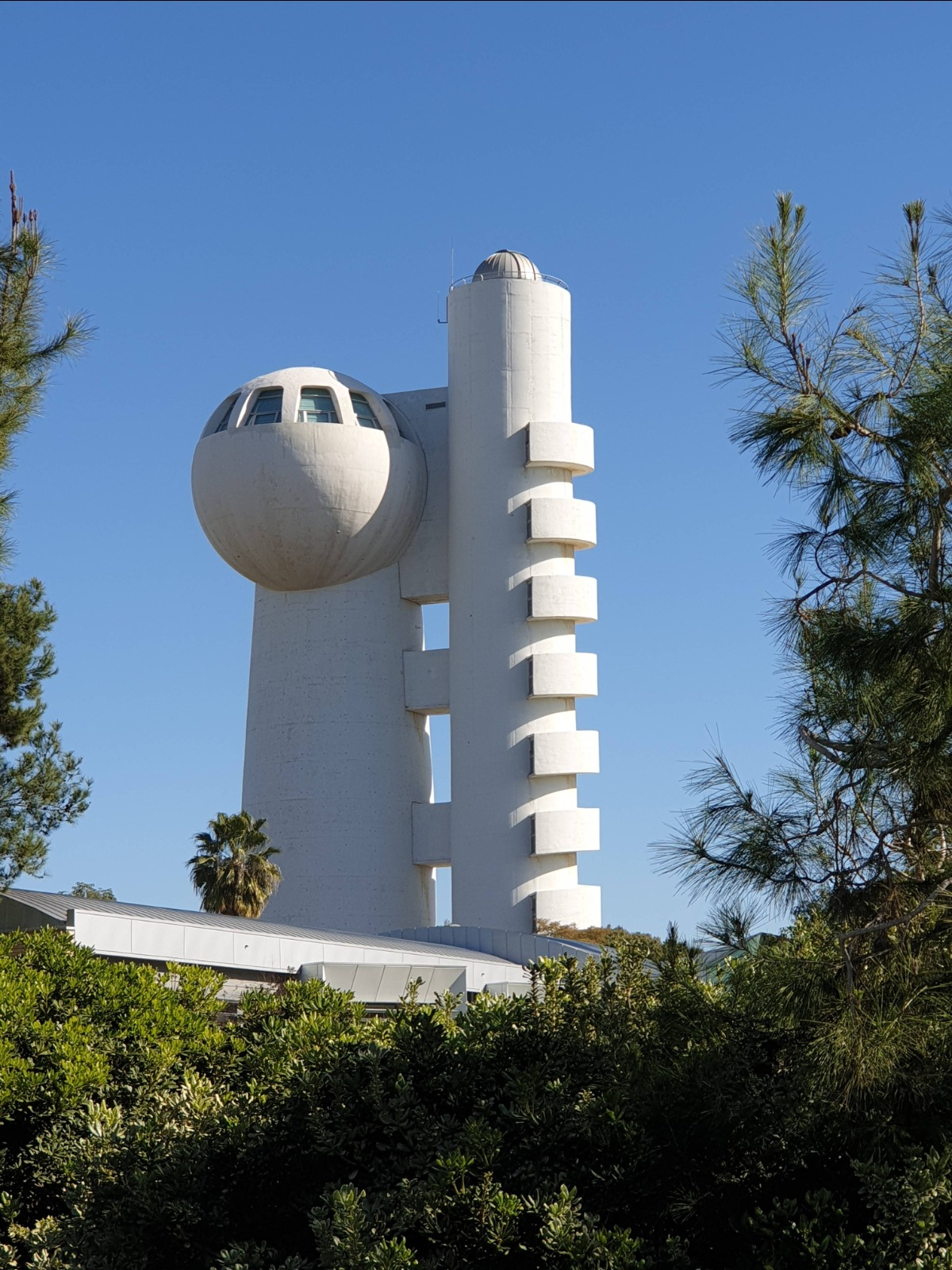
Koffler particle accelerator

The Weizmann Institute of Science (or simply Weizmann; Hebrew: מכון ויצמן למדע Machon Weizmann LeMada) is a postgraduate university and research institute in Rehovot, Israel. It was established in 1934, fourteen years before the State of Israel was founded.

The institute is now a multidisciplinary research center, employing around 3,800 scientists, postdoctoral fellows, Ph.D. and M.Sc. students, and scientific, technical, and administrative staff working at the institute. Unlike other Israeli universities, it exclusively offers postgraduate-only degrees in the natural and exact sciences.

As of 2019, the Weizmann Institute of Science has been associated with six Nobel laureates and three Turing Award winners.

== History ==
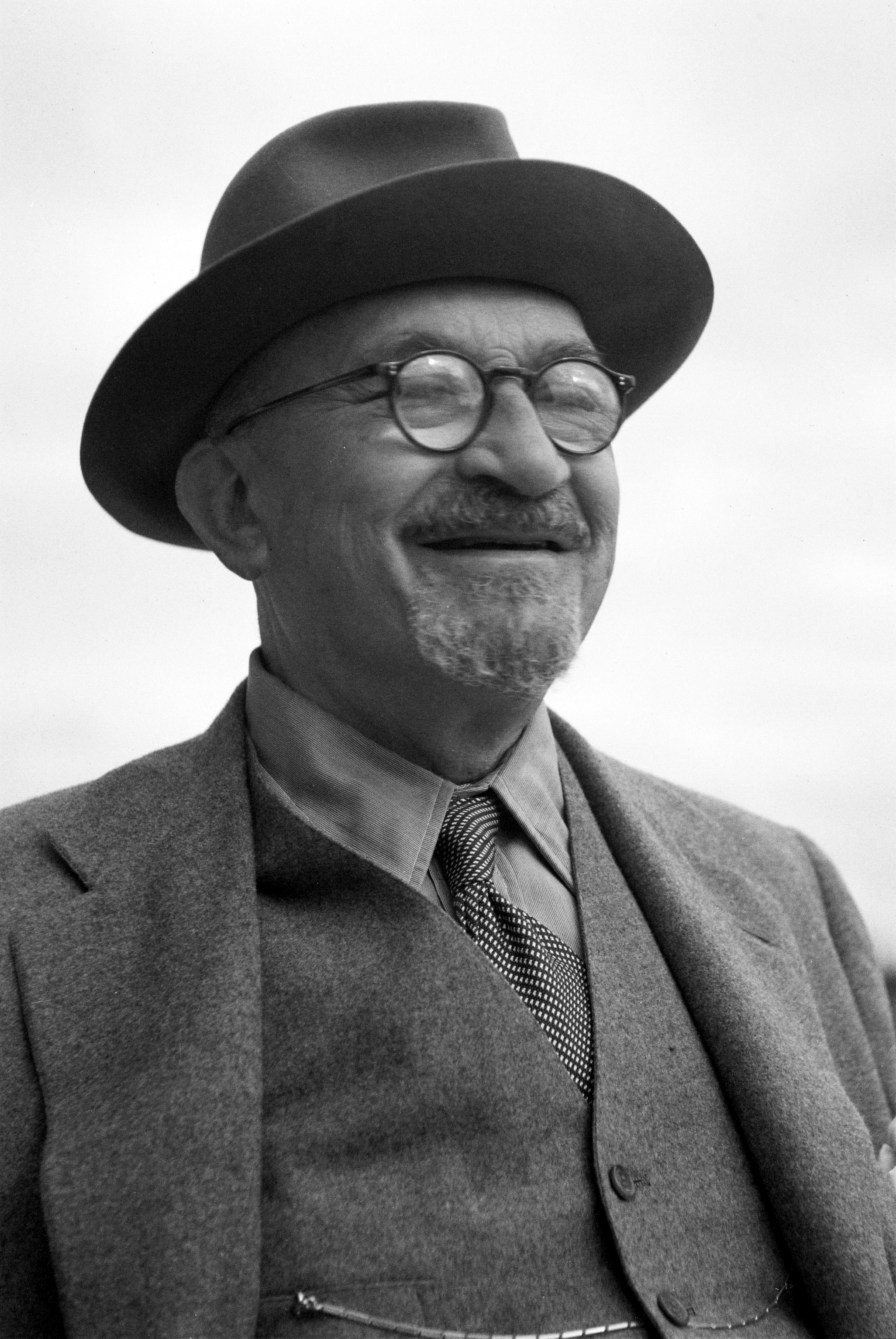
Chaim Weizmann (1874–1952), first president of the State of Israel and founder of the institute

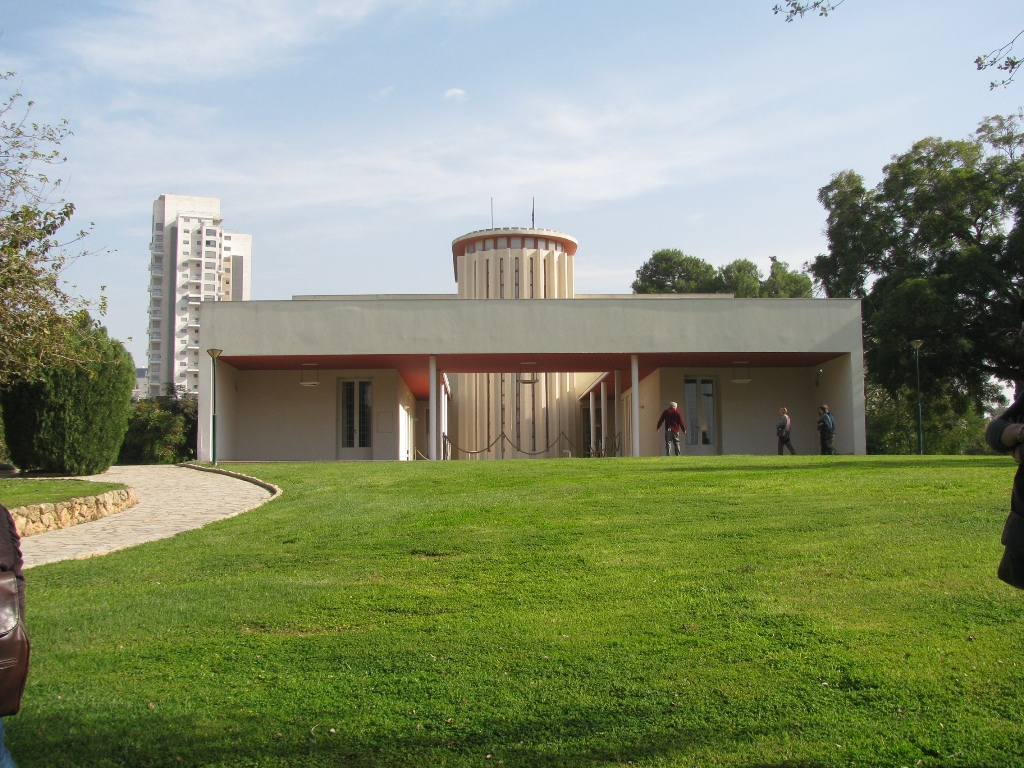
Weizmann residence, designed by Erich Mendelsohn

The institute was founded in 1934 by Chaim Weizmann and his initial (1st) team, which included Benjamin M. Bloch, as the Daniel Sieff Research Institute. Weizmann had invited Nobel Prize laureate Fritz Haber to be the director, but following Haber's death en route to Palestine, Weizmann assumed the directorship himself. Before he became President of Israel in February 1949, Weizmann conducted his research in organic chemistry at its laboratories. On 2 November 1949, in agreement with the Sieff family, the institute was renamed the Weizmann Institute of Science in his honor.

WEIZAC, one of the world's first electronic computers was locally built by the institute in 1954–1955 and was recognized by the IEEE in 2006 as a milestone achievement in the history of electrical and electronic engineering.

In 1959, the institute set up a wholly owned subsidiary called Yeda Research and Development Company to commercialize inventions made at the institute. Yeda has more marine genetic patents than any other research institute. By 2013 the institute was earning between $50 and $100 million in royalties annually on marketed drugs including Copaxone, Rebif, and Erbitux.

The Weizmann Institute of Science and Elbit Systems have collaborated on various projects, notably including the development and supply of the space telescope for Israel's Ultraviolet Transient Astronomy Satellite (ULTRASAT) program and research into bio-inspired materials for defense applications.

=== Iranian airstrike ===
Several buildings in the Institute were destroyed by an Iranian missile strike on 15 June 2025, two days after the 13 June Israeli attack on Iran's nuclear facilities and scientists. It has been proposed by analysts to be either a retaliatory attack for the aforementioned Israeli strike, to previous targeting of Iranian nuclear scientists, or the ties to the defense industry via Elbit Systems. The attack directly hit two buildings — a life sciences building and a chemistry building that was still under construction. Dozens more were damaged. No casualties occurred as the attacks happened at night when most researchers were away. The strike wiped out a hub of cancer research that had international reach, including decades‑old cell lines and cancer biomarker studies, anti-cancer vaccinations research, and more.

== Graduate program ==
As of 2015, the Weizmann Institute had approximately 2,500 students, postdoctoral fellows, staff, and faculty, and awards M.Sc. and Ph.D. degrees in mathematics, computer science, physics, chemistry, biochemistry, and biology, as well as several interdisciplinary programs. The symbol of the Weizmann Institute of Science is the multibranched Ficus tree. Undergraduates and recent graduates must apply to M.Sc. programs, while those earning an M.Sc. or an MD can apply directly to Ph.D. programs. Full fellowships are given to all students.

== Weizmann Memorial Lectures ==
The Weizmann Memorial Lectures are an annual lecture series at the Weizmann Institute of Science.

== Youth programs ==
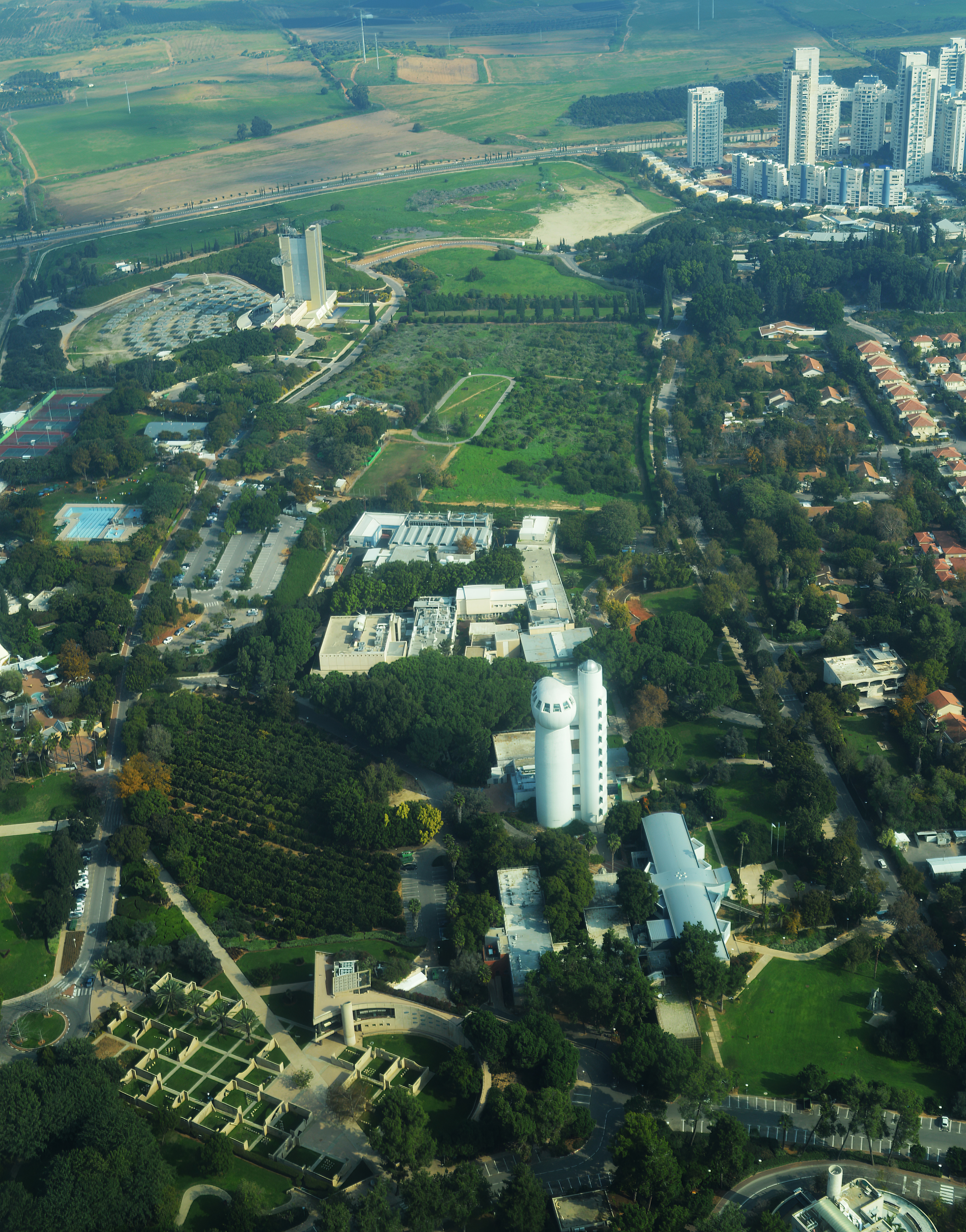
The campus

In addition to its academic programs, the Weizmann Institute runs programs for youth, including science clubs, camps, and competitions. The Bessie F. Lawrence International Summer Science Institute accepts high-school graduates from all over the world for a four-week, science-based summer camp. The Clore Garden of Science, which opened in 1999, is the world's first completely interactive outdoor science museum.

== Rankings ==
University rankings

Global – Overall
- ARWU World: 69 (2024)
- CWTS World: 697 (2024)
- USNWR Global: 131 (2025)

The Weizmann Institute of Science was ranked number 2, globally, for research quality by the Nature Index in 2019, and in the top 25 research institutes/universities in the world in two main categories by U-Multirank, 2019: Top Cited Publications and Patents Awarded. The institute was in 7th place in the European Research Council report in 2020 for its high rate of success in obtaining research grants. In 2018 the institute was ranked 9th, globally, (1st in Israel) by the CWTS Leiden Ranking, which is based on the proportion of a university's scientific papers published between 2012 and 2015 that made the 10% most cited in their field.

== Achievements and developments ==
Over the years, groundbreaking discoveries have emerged from research at the Institute, leading to the development of various technologies and applications. As mentioned, the Institute receives royalties from patents and applications developed within its framework through Yeda Research and Development Company, which manages the Institute's intellectual property.

In 2021, the pre-application research unit "BINA" was established under the Office of the Vice President for Innovation and Applications, Professor Irit Sagi. The unit bridges basic research on campus with commercial activity conducted via Yeda, helps develop early-stage ideas, assists with scientific experiment planning, and connects scientists with industry experts to mature commercial concepts.

From its inception until 2024, around 120 startup companies based on Weizmann Institute research and technologies were founded. In 2022, products based on Institute research generated global sales of over $23 billion.

=== Notable applications in mathematics and computer science ===
- "WEIZAC", a computer built at the Weizmann Institute and launched in 1955, was the first computer in Israel. It was followed by three "Golem" computers.
- In April 2004, the world's first biological computer was completed by Professor Ehud Shapiro.
- Encryption and decryption systems developed by Institute scientists are manufactured in Israel and used, among other applications, for scrambling and decoding television broadcasts.

=== Notable applications in physics ===
- In 1967, Hector R. Rubinstein and his young collaborators at Weizmann Miguel Ángel Virasoro and Gabriele Veneziano have done some foundational research that culminated in the famous Veneziano amplitude that gave birth to string theory.
- In 1983, astrophysicist Mordehai Milgrom developed MOND – Modified Newtonian Dynamics – the most robust alternative to dark matter theories. MOND has been highly successful empirically in explaining galactic rotation curves.
- Advanced laser systems for precise cutting of diamonds.
- In 2022, Israel's first quantum computer, named "WeizQC" (a paraphrase of "WEIZAC"), was launched. It was developed by Professor Roee Ozeri.

=== Notable applications in medicine ===
Applications and technologies in medicine originating from basic research by Weizmann Institute scientists include:

- Affinity chromatography – a method for separating biological substances, central to the biotechnology industry.
- Living polymers – a technique foundational to the polymer industry.
- Discovery of the ribosome structure and understanding of its function, which earned Prof. Ada Yonath the Nobel Prize in Chemistry.
- Several medications developed at the Institute are in use worldwide. The best-selling drugs based on Weizmann research include: Copaxone, Rebif (also known as Avonex), Humira, Erbitux, Vectibix, Enbrel, and Remicade.
- An original method for non-matching bone marrow transplantation, applied in several hospitals in Israel and abroad, as well as a non-invasive procedure to distinguish between malignant tumors and benign tumors using magnetic resonance imaging.

=== Applications in agriculture ===
- Institute scientists developed improved varieties of agricultural crops: high-protein and high-yield wheat, early-ripening melons, and disease-resistant cucumbers.
- A method for growing hybrid seeds that do not transmit diseases between generations. This helps protect food crops from various pests.
- In the 1980s, Professor Mordechai Avron's lab succeeded in getting a single-celled alga called Dunaliella to produce beta-carotene at high levels. Beta-carotene helps prevent eye and skin diseases, high blood pressure, and is a precursor to vitamin A. In cooperation with the Japanese company "Nikken Sohonsha", a nutritional supplement was produced from the alga in a factory established in Eilat.

=== Collaborations with the Science Park ===
Institute scientists initiated the establishment of technology incubators to help scientific and technological personnel—especially immigrants from former Soviet Union countries in the 1990s, develop innovative ideas. One of the first incubators was founded in the nearby Kiryat Weizmann Science Park, chaired by Professor Ruth Arnon. Many scientists from the Institute have served, and continue to serve, in various public roles.

== Sustainability ==
In 1989, the first solar tower in Israel was built on campus (now known as the "Migdal Shemesh").

In 2006, the Sustainability and Energy Research Initiative (SAERI) was launched to support scientific discoveries in the field of alternative energy, and later expanded to include other areas of environmental and sustainability research. This initiative evolved into the Institute for Environmental Sustainability, which aims to consolidate the Weizmann Institute's research and expertise in sustainability under one umbrella. enabling shared resources and fostering interdisciplinary collaboration. Areas covered include food security, climate research, biodiversity, renewable energy, marine science, environment and health, and sustainable materials.

== Architectural planning at the Weizmann Institute of Science ==
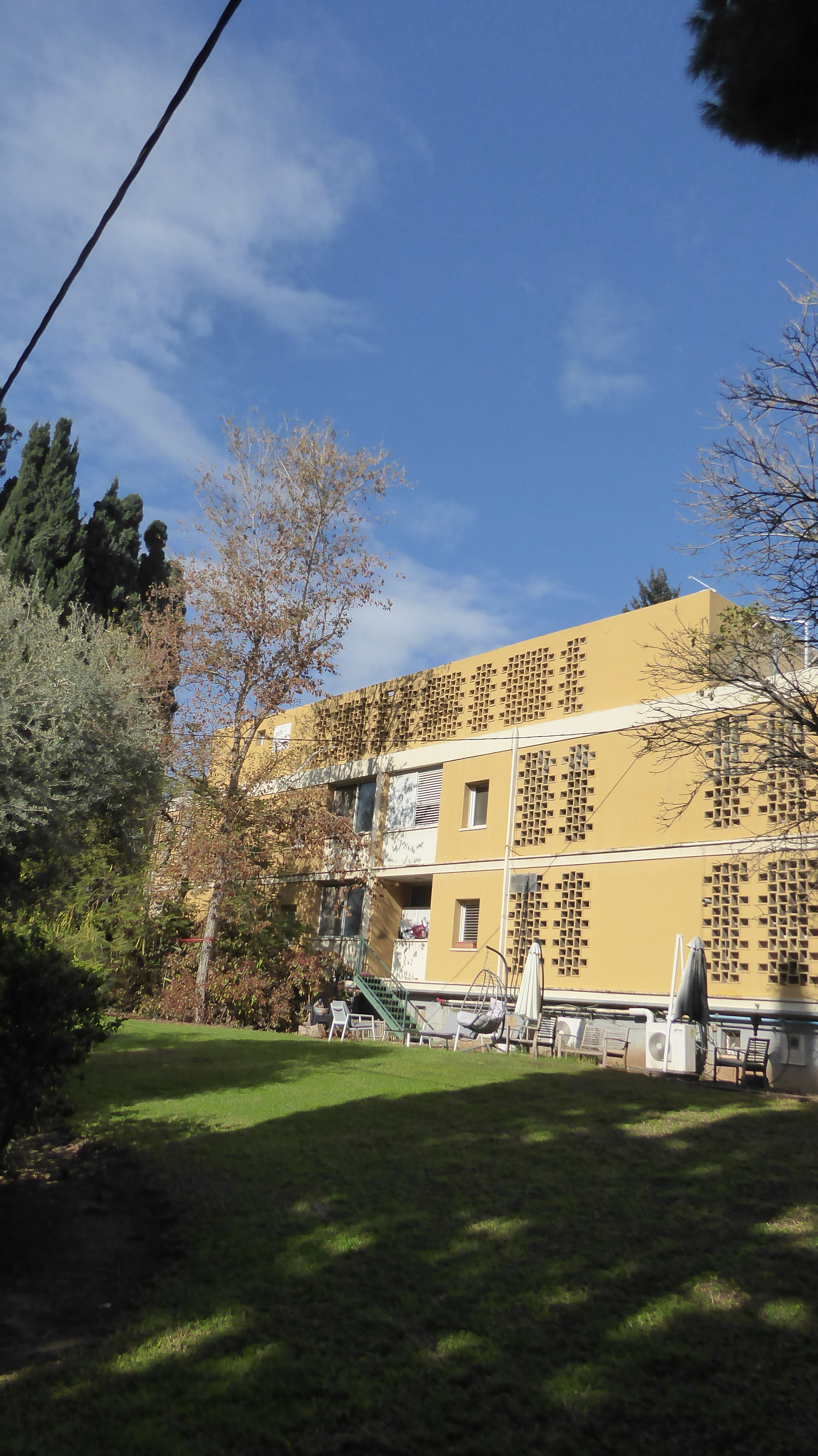
One of the dormitory buildings at the Weizmann Institute

The Institute's campus spans an area of 1,250 dunams. It includes over 100 buildings with a total area of approximately 155,000 m^{2}, as well as around 100 residential units for scientists. About 120 research students live in the Institute's student dormitories. The Institute also holds land reserves (the "Faculty Site") near the Davidson Institute, which were purchased in advance by donors.

=== Preserved buildings on campus ===
The Weizmann Institute has about 24 designated heritage buildings, some under strict preservation due to their architectural importance. These include:

- Ziv Research Institute (1934) – Designed by Benjamin Chaikin, it became the foundation for the Weizmann Institute. Features trilingual inscriptions (Hebrew, Arabic, English) and a logo designed by Erich Mendelsohn and typographer Franziska Baruch. Weizmann's original lab is preserved on the second floor.
- Weizmann Estate – The 1936 villa, designed by Mendelsohn in the International Style, includes the couple's mausoleum, gardens, archive, and guard house. It served as the presidential residence.
- Yaakov Ziskind Building (1949) – Designed by Aryeh Elhanani, Israel Dicker, and Uriel Schiller. The first Institute building after it evolved from Ziv. The first Israeli computer "WEIZAC" was installed here. It was the Middle East's first air-conditioned building.
- Isaac Wolfson Building (1953) – Also by Elhanani. Initially housed experimental biology labs. Additions and entry relocations occurred over time.
- Charles and Tillie Lubin Biology Building (1936) – By Benjamin Orel, partially preserved.
- Danziger Central Utilities Building (1963) – For emergency generators and distilled water production. Restored in 2001.
- Ullmann Life Sciences Building (1963) – By Zalkind, Harel, and Elhanani. Underwent significant façade changes.
- San Martin Club (1954) – Temporary admin offices, later converted to a guesthouse.
- Weizgal House (1948) – Residence of Meir and Shirley Weizgal in the "Neveh Metz" scientist neighborhood.
- Michael Sela Auditorium (1955) – Cultural center named for Prof. Michael Sela.
- David Lopatie Conference Center (1958) – Originally the central library. Renovated in 2011 by architect Amir Kolker.
- Charles Clore Student Dormitory (1963) – Features a relief by artist Dani Karavan titled "From the Tree of Knowledge to the Tree of Life."
- Koffler Accelerator Building (1975) – An iconic structure serving the nuclear physics department.
- Daniel Wolf Building (1939) – The last building Mendelsohn designed in Israel.
- Edna and K.B. Weissmann Physics Building (1957) – Inaugurated with the presence of Ben-Gurion, Ben-Zvi, Robert Oppenheimer, and Niels Bohr.
- David and Pella Schapell Holocaust Memorial Square (1954) – Rededicated in 1972, features a limestone memorial with a Torah scroll fragment by Karavan. The full inscription is revealed by circling it six times—representing six million victims.
- Lunenfeld-Kunin Guest Scientist Residences (1964) – First of a planned three-building housing complex for visiting scientists.
- House of Europe (1974) – Second building in the complex.
- Water Tower (1930s) – Provided water to the acclimatization garden.
- Bloch Gate (1932) – Historic entrance to the Ziv campus, later moved in 1997 due to traffic.

=== Other architecturally significant buildings ===
- Wolfson Villa (1947) – Built with a personal grant from Sir Isaac Wolfson for hospitality use.
- Ephraim Katzir House (1970) – Former residence of Katzir, designed by Elhanani and Nisan Kenan. Now houses the Gershon Kekst International Office.
- Stone Administration Building (1966) – Features a mural by artist Naftali Bezem.
- Canada Centre for Solar Energy (1988) – 52-meter "Solar Tower" repurposed in 2014 for personalized medicine.
- School of Research Building (1960s) – Formerly the Feinberg Graduate School; designed by Idelson and Gershon Tsipor.

=== Campus gates ===
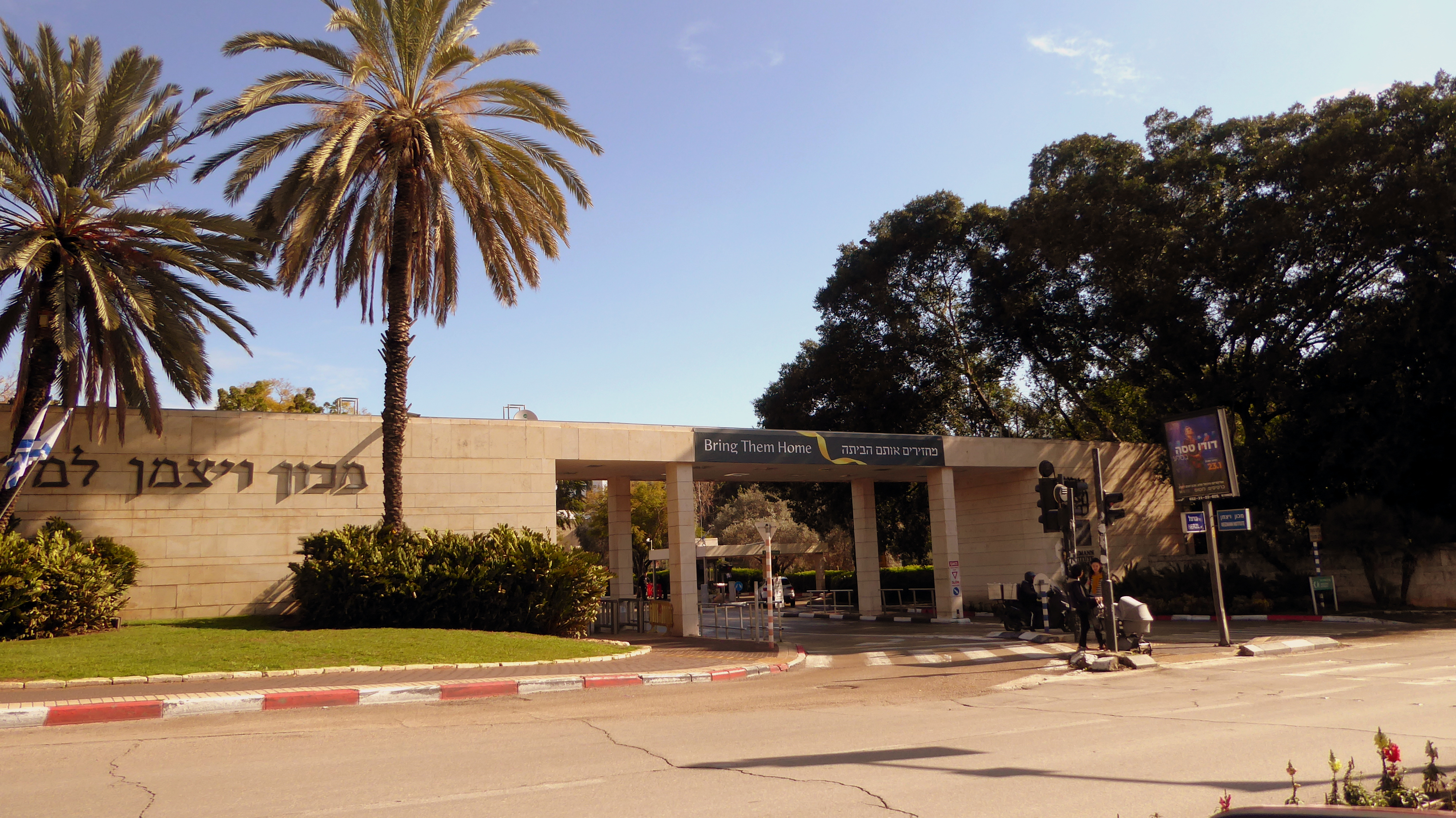
Main gate with sign calling for the return of hostages during the Gaza war

The Institute has six active gates:

- Main Gate – Located on Herzl Street, opposite Yavne Road.
- Bloch Gate – Opposite the Faculty of Agriculture.
- South Gate – For pedestrians and bicycles only.
- Pinsker Street Gate – Pedestrian gate.
- Davidson Gate – Near the Schwartz/Reisman campus and Davidson Institute HQ.
- Train Gate – For pedestrians connecting to Rehovot Railway Station.
- Palace Gate – Closed gate leading to the Weizmann House.

=== Visitor centers on campus ===
The campus hosts three active visitor centers:

- Levinson Visitors Center (2011) – Offers a free interactive tour and 8-minute film. Visited by ~20,000 people in 2022. Includes a souvenir shop.
- Clore Garden of Science – Reopened in 2024 with 9 thematic areas: Motion, Light, Code, Matter, Life, Earth, Plants, Brain, and Water. Entrance by ticket.
- Weizmann House – Built in 1936, former presidential residence. Now a heritage center honoring the Weizmann legacy.

=== Campus gardens ===
Approximately 6,800 trees of over 100 species grow on campus, which serves as a public green space. Highlights include:

- Acclimatization Garden – Early 20th-century agricultural experiment station introducing sub-tropical trees like mango, avocado, and loquat to Israel.
- Cactus Garden – 2,000 m² garden opened in 2019, named after Hannah and Amnon Kaduri, who donated their cactus collection.
- Japanese Garden – Covers ~6,500 m² near Lopatie Center. Designed by landscape architects Lior Wolf and Baha Milhem. Features waterfalls, stones, plane trees, and aquatic plants.
- Bloch Avenue – Historic ficus avenue planted in the 1930s, leading from Bloch Gate to the original Ziv building.

=== Image gallery ===
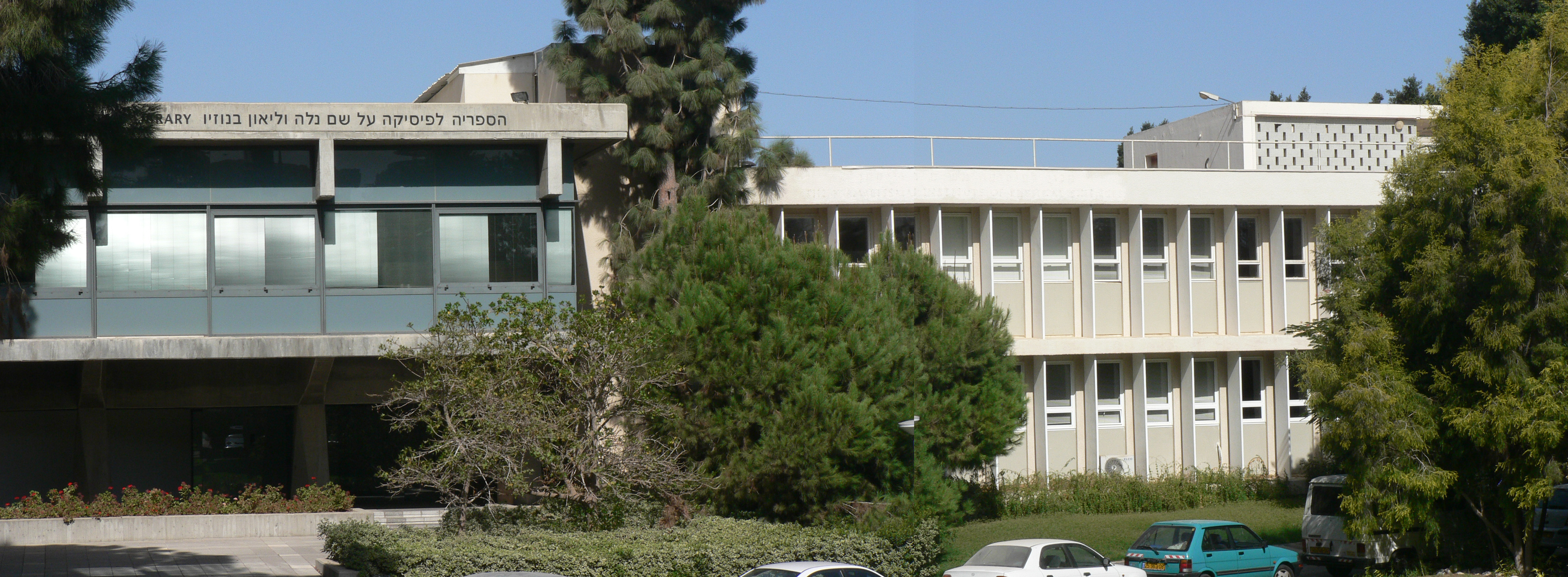
Faculty of Physics (Weissmann and Bonozio buildings)

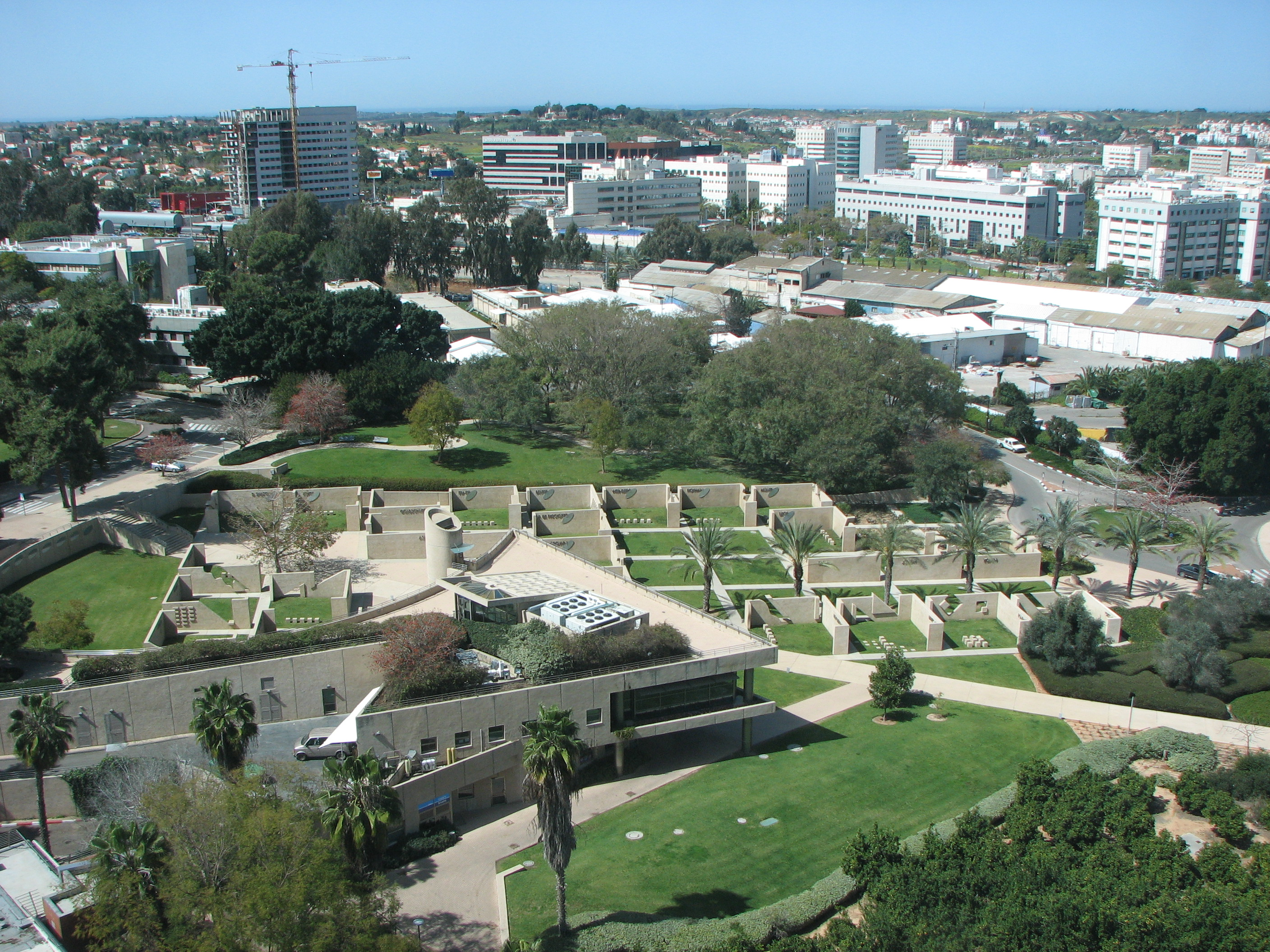
Aerial view from the accelerator tower, 2009

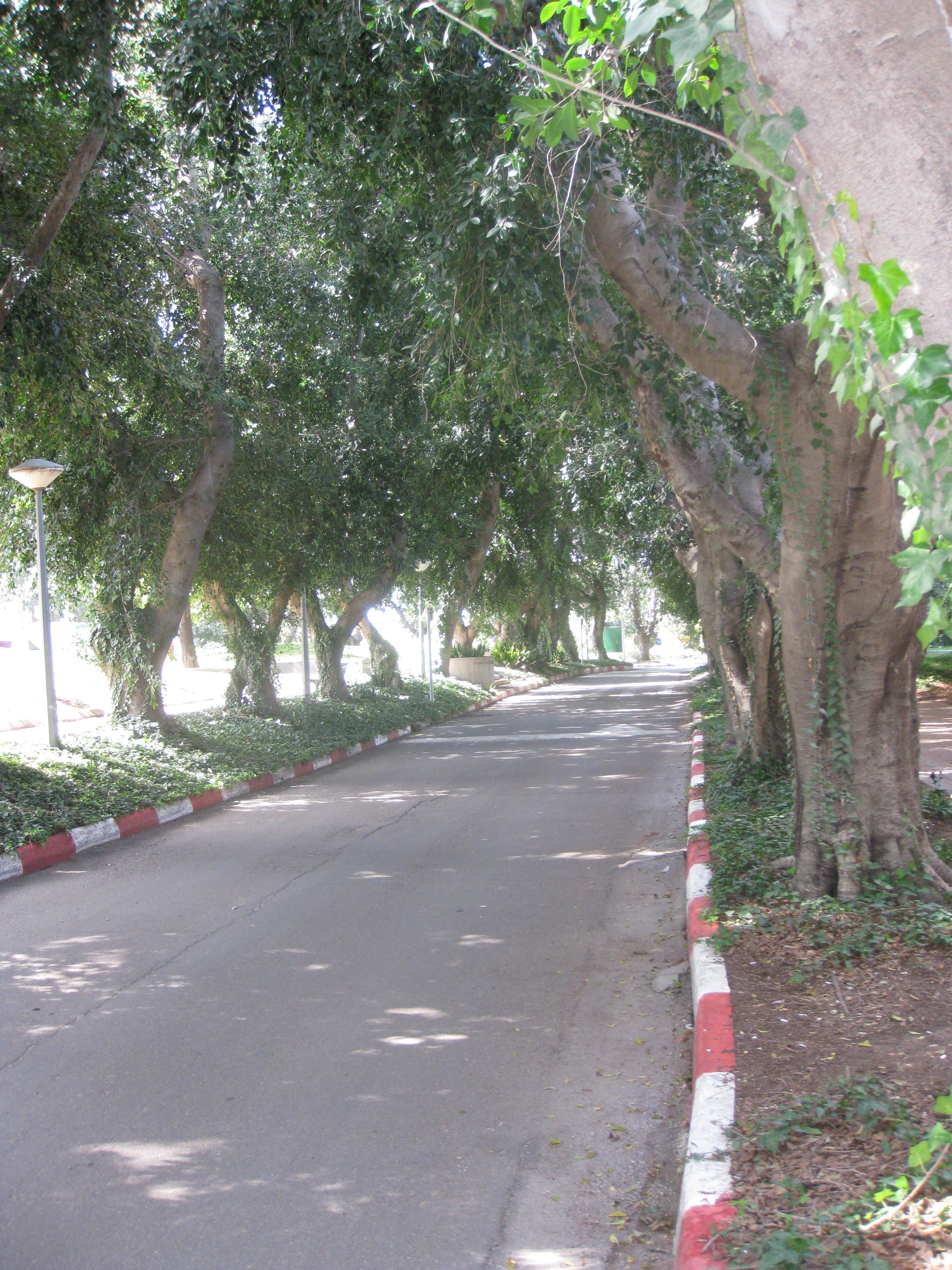
Tree-lined walk at the "Faculty Gate"

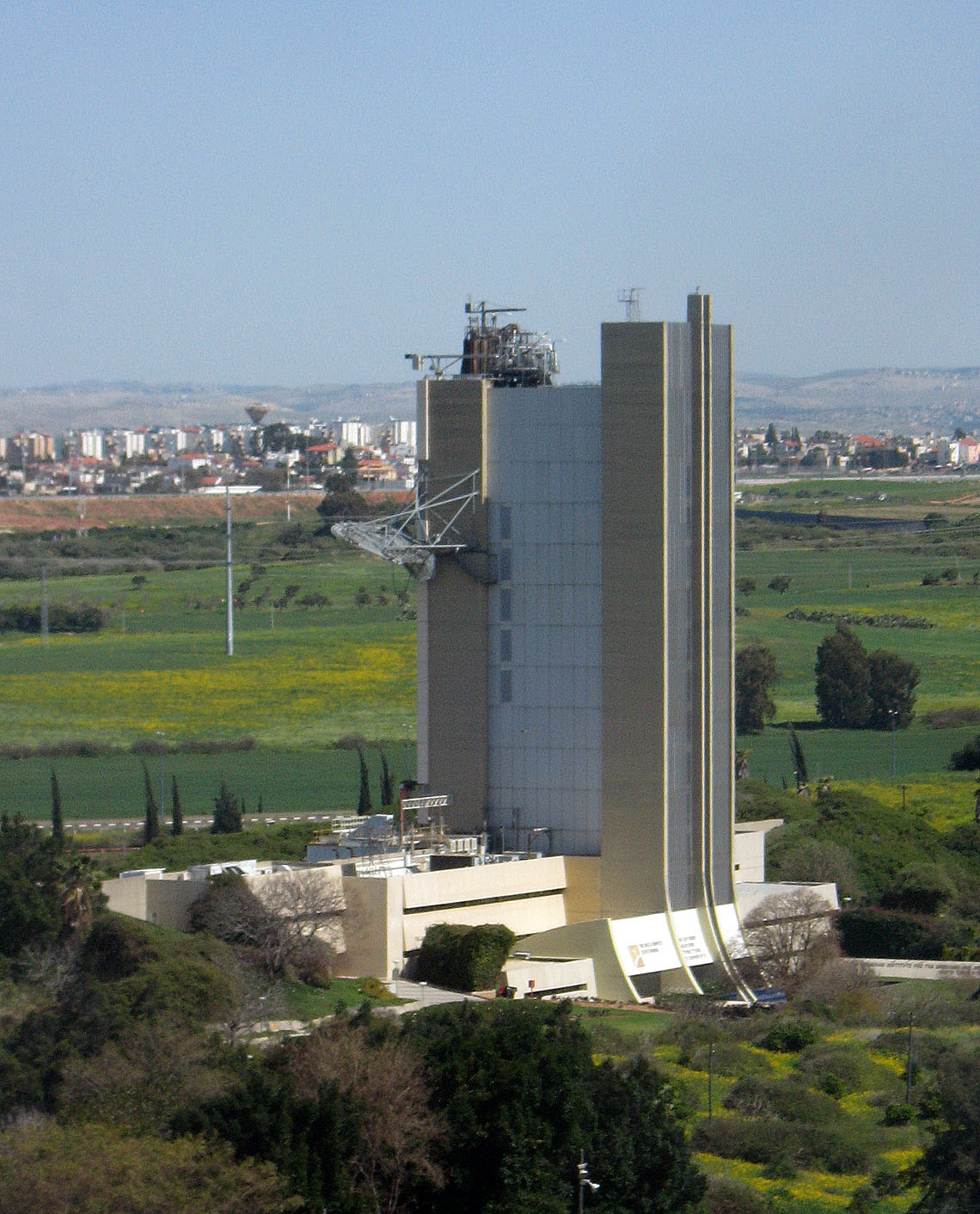
Solar Tower, 2009

== Presidents ==
- Chaim Weizmann (1934–1952)
- Meyer Weisgal (1952–1959 as acting director)
- Abba Eban (1959–1966)
- Meyer Weisgal (1966–1970)
- Albert Sabin (1970–1972)
- Israel Dostrovsky (1972–1975)
- Michael Sela (1975–1985)
- Aryeh Dvoretzky (1985–1988)
- Haim Harari (1988–2001)
- Ilan Chet (2001–2006)
- Daniel Zajfman (2006–2019)
- Alon Chen (2019–present)

The nonscientists Abba Eban and Meyer Weisgal were assisted by scientific directors, as was Weizmann himself owing to his duties as the first president of Israel. The following persons held the position of scientific director:

- Ernst David Bergmann (1949–1951)
- Amos de-Shalit (1960–1961 and 1966–1968)
- Shneior Lifson (1962–1966)
- Gerhard Schmidt (1969)

== Faculty ==
- Uri Alon, systems biologist
- Ruth Arnon, immunologist
- Arkady Aronov, condensed matter physicist
- Mordechai Ben-Ari, computer scientist
- Ari Ben-Menahem, geophysicist
- Achi Brandt, mathematician
- Shikma Bressler, physicist
- Irun Cohen, immunologist
- David Danon, biologist
- Amos de-Shalit, physicist
- Irit Dinur, computer scientist and mathematician
- Israel Dostrovsky, physical chemist
- Yadin Dudai, neuroscientist
- Harry Dym, mathematician
- Marvin Edelman, biologist
- Benjamin Elazari Volcani, discoverer of life in the Dead Sea and pioneer in biological silicon research
- Aviezri Fraenkel, mathematician
- Asher A. Friesem, physicist
- Stephen Gelbart, mathematician
- Joseph Gillis, mathematician
- Daniella Goldfarb, chemist
- Oded Goldreich, computer scientist
- Shafrira Goldwasser, computer scientist, two-time winner of the Gödel Prize (1993 and 2001), and the Turing Award (2012)
- Jacob Hanna, molecular geneticist
- Haim Harari, theoretical physicist
- David Harel, computer scientist
- Yoseph Imry, theoretical physicist
- Michal Irani, computer scientist
- Yohai Kaspi, physicist
- Aharon Katzir, chemist
- Ephraim Katzir, biophysicist, fourth President of the State of Israel
- Bruria Kaufman, theoretical physicist
- Jacob Klein, chemist
- Ilya Kuprov, physicist
- Meir Lahav, chemist
- Erez Lapid, mathematician
- Leslie Leiserowitz, chemist
- Ulf Leonhardt, physicist
- Alexander Lerner, mathematician
- Michael Levitt, chemical physics, presently at Stanford University, Nobel Prize in Chemistry winner (2013)
- Moshe Levy, chemist
- Shneior Lifson, physicist
- Harry J. Lipkin, physicist
- Henry Markram, neuroscientist
- Mordehai Milgrom, astrophysicist
- David Milstein, organic chemist
- Moni Naor, computer scientist
- Yuval Oreg, physicist
- Chaim L. Pekeris, geophysicist
- Amir Pnueli, computer scientist, Turing Award winner (1996)
- Ran Raz, computer scientist
- Amitai Regev, mathematician
- Omer Reingold, computer scientist
- Leo Sachs, molecular biologist
- Josip Schlessinger, biochemist and biophysician
- Michal Schwartz, neuroimmunologist
- David Samuel, 3rd Viscount Samuel, chemist
- Eran Segal, computational biologist
- Lee Segel, applied mathematician
- Michael Sela, immunologist
- Adi Shamir, cryptographer, Turing Award winner (2002)
- Ehud Shapiro, computer scientist and computational biologist
- Nathan Sharon, biochemist
- Amnon Shashua, computer scientist
- Liran Shlush, immunologist
- Franz Sondheimer, chemist
- Ady Stern, physicist
- Joel Sussman, crystallographer
- Igal Talmi, physicist
- David Tannor, theoretical chemist
- Dan Tawfik, biochemist, EMET Prize 2020
- Reshef Tenne, chemist
- Edward Trifonov, molecular biophysicist
- Shimon Ullman, computer scientist
- Gabriele Veneziano, theoretical physicist
- David Wallach, biochemist
- Arieh Warshel, chemical physics, presently at University of Southern California, Nobel Prize in Chemistry winner (2013)
- Chaim Weizmann, chemist, first President of the State of Israel
- Meir Wilchek, biochemist
- Ada Yonath, crystallographer, Nobel Prize in Chemistry winner (2009)
- Daniel Zajfman, physicist

== Alumni ==
- Amikam Aharoni, physicist
- Dorit Aharonov, computer scientist
- Joanna Aizenberg, professor of chemistry
- Uri Alon, systems biologist
- Ella Amitay Sadovsky, artist
- Haim Aviv, molecular biologist
- Karen Avraham, geneticist
- Neta Bahcall, astrophysicist
- Eli Biham, cryptographer and cryptanalyst
- Ofer Biham, physicist
- Achi Brandt, mathematician
- Joseph Buxbaum, geneticist and neuroscientist
- Alon Chen, neuroscientist
- Nachum Dershowitz, computer scientist
- Danny Dolev, computer scientist
- Dov Dori, computer scientist
- Yadin Dudai, neuroscientist
- Amos Fiat, computer scientist
- Nir Friedman, computer scientist and biologist
- Ehud Gazit, biochemist and nanotechnologist
- Alexander Goldfarb, microbiologist, activist, and author
- Eliezer (Eli) Huberman, biologist
- Yoseph Imry, theoretical physicist
- Leah Keshet, mathematical biologist
- Jonathan Kipnis, neuroscientist
- Bernard H. Lavenda, chemical physicist
- Anders Levermann, climate scientist
- Alexander Levitzki, biochemist
- Yehuda Lindell, computer scientist
- Mario Livio, astrophysicist
- Miron Livny, computer scientist
- Henry Markram, neuroscientist
- Yossi Matias, computer scientist
- Raphael Mechoulam, organic chemist
- David Peleg, computer scientist
- Amir Pnueli, computer scientist
- Omer Reingold, computer scientist
- Gideon Rodan, biochemist
- Asya Rolls, neuroscientist
- Barton Rubenstein, modernist sculptor
- Shmuel Safra, computer scientist
- Josip Schlessinger, biochemist and biophysician
- Nathan Seiberg, physicist
- Adi Shamir, cryptographer
- Amnon Shashua, computer scientist
- Andrey Sivachenko, computational biologist and computer scientist, Professor at Harvard University Extension School
- Nahum Sonenberg, biochemist
- Hermona Soreq, molecular neuroscientist
- Dan Tawfik, biochemist
- Eli Upfal, computer scientist
- Lev Vaidman, physicist
- Moshe Vardi, computer scientist
- Inder Verma, cancer researcher and molecular biologist
- Arieh Warshel, chemist
- Meir Wilchek, biochemist
- Ada Yonath, crystallographer
- Doron Zeilberger, mathematician
- Eitan Zemel, applied mathematician

== See also ==
- List of universities in Israel
- Science and technology in Israel
