= Wannier equation =

The Wannier equation describes a quantum mechanical eigenvalue problem in solids where an electron in a conduction band and an electronic vacancy (i.e. hole) within a valence band attract each other via the Coulomb interaction. For one electron and one hole, this problem is analogous to the Schrödinger equation of the hydrogen atom; and the bound-state solutions are called excitons. When an exciton's radius extends over several unit cells, it is referred to as a Wannier exciton in contrast to Frenkel excitons whose size is comparable with the unit cell. An excited solid typically contains many electrons and holes; this modifies the Wannier equation considerably. The resulting generalized Wannier equation can be determined from the homogeneous part of the semiconductor Bloch equations or the semiconductor luminescence equations.

The equation is named after Gregory Wannier.

== Background ==
Since an electron and a hole have opposite charges their mutual Coulomb interaction is attractive. The corresponding Schrödinger equation, in relative coordinate $\mathbf{r}$, has the same form as the hydrogen atom:

$$- \left[\frac{\hbar^2 \nabla^2}{2\mu} + V(\mathbf{r}) \right] \phi_\lambda (\mathbf{r}) = E_\lambda \phi_\lambda (\mathbf{r})\,,$$

with the potential given by

$$V(\mathbf{r}) = \frac{e^2}{4\pi \varepsilon_r \varepsilon_0 |\mathbf{r}|}\,.$$

Here, $\hbar$ is the reduced Planck constant, $\nabla$ is the nabla operator, $\mu$ is the reduced mass, $-|e|$ ($+|e|$) is the elementary charge related to an electron (hole), $\varepsilon_r$ is the relative permittivity, and $\varepsilon_0$ is the vacuum permittivity. The solutions of the hydrogen atom are described by eigenfunction $\phi_\lambda (\mathbf{r})$ and eigenenergy $E_\lambda$ where $\lambda$ is a quantum number labeling the different states.

In a solid, the scaling of $E_\lambda$ and the wavefunction size are orders of magnitude different from the hydrogen problem because the relative permittivity $\varepsilon_r$ is roughly ten and the reduced mass in a solid is much smaller than the electron rest mass $m_e$, i.e., $\mu \ll m_e$. As a result, the exciton radius can be large while the exciton binding energy is small, typically few to hundreds of meV, depending on material, compared to eV for the hydrogen problem.

The Fourier transformed version of the presented Hamiltonian can be written as

$$E_{\mathbf{k}} \phi_\lambda(\mathbf{k}) - \sum_{\mathbf{k'}} V_{\mathbf{k}-\mathbf{k'}} \phi_\lambda (\mathbf{k'}) = E_\lambda \phi_\lambda (\mathbf{k})\,,$$

where $\mathbf{k}$ is the electronic wave vector, $E_{\mathbf{k}}$ is the kinetic energy and $V_{\mathbf{k}}$, $\phi_\lambda (\mathbf{k})$ are the Fourier transforms of $V(\mathbf{r})$, $\phi_\lambda (\mathbf{r})$, respectively. The Coulomb sums follows from the convolution theorem and the $\mathbf{k}$-representation is useful when introducing the generalized Wannier equation.

== Generalized Wannier equation ==
The Wannier equation can be generalized by including the presence of many electrons and holes in the excited system. One can start from the general theory of either optical excitations or light emission in semiconductors that can be systematically described using the semiconductor Bloch equations (SBE) or the semiconductor luminescence equations (SLE), respectively. The homogeneous parts of these equations produce the Wannier equation at the low-density limit. Therefore, the homogeneous parts of the SBE and SLE provide a physically meaningful way to identify excitons at arbitrary excitation levels. The resulting generalized Wannier equation is

$$\tilde{\epsilon}_{\mathbf{k}} \phi_{\lambda}^{\mathrm{R}}(\mathbf{k}) - \sum_{\mathbf{k'}} V_{\mathbf{k}-\mathbf{k'}}^{\mathrm{eff}} \phi_{\lambda}^{\mathrm{R}}(\mathbf{k'}) = \epsilon_{\lambda} \phi_{\lambda}^{\mathrm{R}}(\mathbf{k}) \,,$$

where the kinetic energy becomes renormalized

$$\tilde{\epsilon}_{\mathbf{k}}
=
E_{\mathbf{k}}
-
\sum_{\mathbf{k}'} V_{{\mathbf{k}}'-{\mathbf{k}}}
\left(f^e_{\mathbf{k}'} + f^h_{\mathbf{k}'} \right)
\,,$$

by the electron and hole occupations $f^e_{\mathbf{k}}$ and $f^h_{\mathbf{k}}$, respectively. These also modify the Coulomb interaction into

$$V_{\mathbf{k}-\mathbf{k'}}^{\mathrm{eff}} \equiv (1 - f^\mathrm{e}_{\mathbf{k}} -f^\mathrm{h}_{\mathbf{k}}) V_{\mathbf{k}-\mathbf{k'}}
\,,$$

where $(1 - f^\mathrm{e}_{\mathbf{k}} -f^\mathrm{h}_{\mathbf{k}})$ weakens the Coulomb interaction via the so-called phase-space filling factor that stems from the Pauli exclusion principle preventing multiple excitations of fermions. Due to the phase-space filling factor, the Coulomb attraction becomes repulsive for excitations levels $f^\mathrm{e}_{\mathbf{k}} +f^\mathrm{h}_{\mathbf{k}}>1$. At this regime, the generalized Wannier equation produces only unbound solutions which follow from the excitonic Mott transition from bound to ionized electron–hole pairs.

Once electron–hole densities exist, the generalized Wannier equation is not Hermitian anymore. As a result, the eigenvalue problem has both left- and right-handed eigenstates $\phi_{\lambda}^{\mathrm{L}}(\mathbf{k})$ and $\phi_{\lambda}^{\mathrm{R}}(\mathbf{k})$, respectively. They are connected via the phase-space filling factor, i.e. $\phi_{\lambda}^{\mathrm{L}}(\mathbf{k})=\phi_{\lambda}^{\mathrm{R}}(\mathbf{k})/(1 - f^\mathrm{e}_{\mathbf{k}} -f^\mathrm{h}_{\mathbf{k}})$. The left- and right-handed eigenstates have the same eigen value $E_\lambda$ (that is real valued for the form shown) and they form a complete set of orthogonal solutions since

$$\sum_{\mathbf{k}} \left[\phi^L_\lambda(\mathbf{k})\right]^\star \, \phi^R_\nu(\mathbf{k})=\sum_{\mathbf{k}} \left[\phi^R_\lambda(\mathbf{k})\right]^\star \, \phi^L_\nu(\mathbf{k})= \delta_{\lambda,\nu}$$.

The Wannier equations can also be generalized to include scattering and screening effects that appear due to two-particle correlations within the SBE. This extension also produces left- and right-handed eigenstate, but their connection is more complicated than presented above. Additionally, $E_\lambda$ becomes complex valued and the imaginary part of $E_\lambda$ defines the lifetime of the resonance $\lambda$.

Physically, the generalized Wannier equation describes how the presence of other electron–hole pairs modifies the binding of one effective pair. As main consequences, an excitation tends to weaken the Coulomb interaction and renormalize the single-particle energies in the simplest form. Once also correlation effects are included, one additionally observes the screening of the Coulomb interaction, excitation-induced dephasing, and excitation-induced energy shifts. All these aspects are important when semiconductor experiments are explained in detail.

== Applications ==
Due to the analogy with the hydrogen problem, the zero-density eigenstates are known analytically for any bulk semiconductor when excitations close to the bottom of the electronic bands are studied. In nanostructured materials, such as quantum wells, quantum wires, and quantum dots, the Coulomb-matrix element $V_{\mathbf{k}}$ strongly deviates from the ideal two- and three-dimensional systems due to finite quantum confinement of electronic states. Hence, one cannot solve the zero-density Wannier equation analytically for those situations, but needs to resort to numerical eigenvalue solvers. In general, only numerical solutions are possible for all semiconductor cases when exciton states are solved within an excited matter. Further examples are shown in the context of the Elliott formula.

== See also ==
- Excitons
- Semiconductor Bloch equations
- Semiconductor luminescence equations
- Elliott formula
- Eigenvalues and eigenvectors
- Quantum well
- Quantum wire
- Quantum dot
