= Stephan W. Koch =

German theoretical physicist

- Born: 23 May 1953; Frankfurt am Main
- Died: 12 September 2022; Fronhausen
- Education: University of Frankfurt
- Known for: Semiconductor Bloch equations
- Awards: Leibniz Prize (1997); Max Planck Research Award (1999)
- Scientific career
- Fields: Physicist
- Workplaces: University of Marburg
- Doctoral advisor: Hartmut Haug

Stephan W. Koch (23 May 1953 in Frankfurt am Main – 12 September 2022 in Fronhausen) was a German theoretical physicist. He was a professor at the University of Marburg and works on condensed-matter theory, many-body effects, and laser theory. He is best known for his seminal contributions to the optical and electronic properties of semiconductors, semiconductor quantum optics, and semiconductor laser designs. Major portion of his research work has focused on the quantum physics and application potential of semiconductor nanostructures. Besides gaining fundamental insights to the many-body quantum theory, his work has provided new possibilities to develop, e.g., laser technology, based on accurate computer simulations. His objective has been to self-consistently include all relevant many-body effects in order to eliminate phenomenological approximations that compromise predictability of effects and quantum-device designs.

== Biography ==
Stephan W. Koch studied physics at the University of Frankfurt, obtained his doctorate 1979 about the theory of electron–hole droplet nucleation in strongly excited semiconductors under the supervision of Hartmut Haug. During 1981–83, he was a postdoctoral fellow and visiting scientist at the IBM Research, San Jose/California and received habilitation in 1983 about the dynamics of equilibrium and non-equilibrium first-order phase transitions, from the Department of Theoretical Physics of the University of Frankfurt. He continued his active research both in Germany and US with the help of scholarships from the F. Thyssen Foundation and of the Heisenberg Program of the Deutsche Forschungsgemeinschaft. In 1986, he became professor at the Physics Department and Optical Sciences Center of the University of Arizona in Tucson, AZ, and in 1989, he accepted a chair there. In 1993, he accepted a chair of theoretical physics at the University of Marburg, where he has worked ever since. Stephan W. Koch has very close ties with the research efforts at the Optical Sciences Center, University of Arizona, where he has been an adjunct professor and an active collaborator since 1994.

== Main research topics ==
Stephan W. Koch has worked on multiple topics in the general field of semiconductor optics. Before the year 1988, the state-of-the-art description of semiconductor optics and lasers was mainly based on simplified rate-equation approaches which cannot describe the nonequilibrium quantum kinetics of Coulomb-coupled electrons and holes (electronic vacancies in valence band). To go beyond this approach, he was one of the key players to develop the semiconductor Bloch equations (abbreviated as SBEs). Ever since this breakthrough, the SBEs have been expanded to systematically include new many-body effects such as excitation-induced dephasing, non-Markovian effects, and semiconductor excitations with terahertz (abbreviated as THz) fields. The SBEs research is still very active, and the SBEs are the most sophisticated and successful approach to describe optical properties of semiconductors originating from the classical light–matter interaction.

During the late 1980s, quantum-dot systems started to catch a significant research attention worldwide due to their intriguing quantum-confinement properties. He and his coworkers demonstrated the configuration-interaction approach and its application to the optical properties of strongly quantum-confined semiconductors. This approach is actively used in order to explain the quantum-optical properties of quantum-dot systems.

Several of his ongoing projects focus on problems arising in the area of modern semiconductor quantum optics, microcavities, and laser theory. In this field, Stephan W. Koch and his coworkers have concentrated on explaining how the quantum features of light can be described in connection with semiconductors. The novelty and difficulty of this research stems from determining and controlling many-body and quantum-optical features simultaneously. The first step toward this direction emerged in the form of the semiconductor luminescence equations (abbreviated as SLEs); the SLEs describe the quantum physics where quantum fluctuations of light initiate incoherent light emission from spontaneous recombination of Coulomb-coupled electron–hole pairs. The SLEs not only set the standard in describing quantum-light emission in semiconductors but they are also ideally suited for modeling quantum-light sources and filters based on semiconductor technology. The extensions of SLEs include resonance fluorescence and higher-order photon-correlation effects and are the basis to expand the quantum-optical spectroscopy.

He and his coworkers are working on a systematic theory to describe excitation of solids with THz fields. Typical laser excitations are resonant with band-to-band transitions, not the energy difference of several relevant many-body states that actually match the THz-photon energy. Therefore, THz spectroscopy offers a new way to view many-body systems, e.g., by detecting particular many-body states directly or by controlling their quantum dynamics. This research direction seems currently particularly lucrative due to the rapid progress of THz technology in producing high-quality, intense and/or single-cycle THz sources and lasers for spectroscopic purposes.

Stephan W. Koch's innovations have always caught broad interest within the research community; his papers have been cited more than 15000 times to date (2013).

== Awards ==
Stephan W. Koch has received numerous awards for his achievements in the field of semiconductor optics. Most notably due to his work on the theoretical foundations of light–matter interaction in semiconductor materials, he received the Leibniz Prize of the Deutsche Forschungsgemeinschaft in 1997 and the Max Planck Research Award of the Alexander von Humboldt Foundation and of the Max Planck Society in 1999.

== Books ==
Stephan W. Koch has coauthored eight text books that have had a major effect on laying solid foundations to understand semiconductor optics and semiconductor quantum optics. His most recent work includes:

- Kira, Mackillo (2012). Semiconductor quantum optics. Cambridge, UK New York: Cambridge University Press. ISBN 978-0-521-87509-7. OCLC 774110559. Website of this book (sqobook.org)
- Haug, Hartmut (2009). Quantum theory of the optical and electronic properties of semiconductors. Singapore Hackensack, N.J: World Scientific. ISBN 978-981-283-884-1. OCLC 297811039.
- Meier, Torsten (2007). Coherent semiconductor optics: from basic concepts to nanostructure applications. Berlin New York: Springer. ISBN 978-3-540-32555-0. OCLC 105375611.
