= Terahertz spectroscopy =

Molecule investigation technique

Terahertz spectroscopy refers to spectroscopic techniques that probe materials using electromagnetic radiation in the terahertz (THz) region, typically from ~0.1 to 10 THz (3 mm–30 μm). THz spectroscopy accesses low-energy excitations such as rotational and vibrational transitions in molecules, phonons and collective modes in solids, charge transport in semiconductors and superconductors, and intermolecular interactions in liquids and biomaterials.

Two major approaches are used: time-domain terahertz spectroscopy (THz-TDS), which employs pulsed THz radiation and waveform sampling, and frequency-domain terahertz spectroscopy (THz-FDS), which uses continuous-wave radiation and sweeps frequency. THz-TDS provides broadband access to amplitude and phase information and is widely used for materials characterization, imaging, and non-destructive evaluation. THz-FDS offers extremely high spectral resolution, often below 1 MHz, enabling Doppler-limited gas-phase spectroscopy, rotational spectroscopy, and precision metrology.

THz spectroscopy has applications in condensed-matter physics, chemistry, atmospheric and environmental sensing, security screening, pharmaceuticals, telecommunications, cultural-heritage analysis, biomedical imaging, and industrial quality control. THz systems can operate in free-space or waveguide geometries and may employ photoconductive emitters and detectors, nonlinear optical generation, photomixing, electronic sources, or quantum cascade lasers.

== Background ==
There are a great variety of techniques to generate THz radiation and to detect THz fields. One can, e.g., use an antenna, a quantum-cascade laser, a free-electron laser, or optical rectification to produce well-defined THz sources. The resulting THz field can be characterized via its electric field E_{THz}(t). Present-day experiments can already output E_{THz}(t) that has a peak value in the range of MV/cm (megavolts per centimeter). To estimate how strong such fields are, one can compute the level of energy change such fields induce to an electron over microscopic distance of one nanometer (nm), i.e., L = 1 nm. One simply multiplies the peak E_{THz}(t) with elementary charge e and L to obtain e E_{THz}(t) L = 100 meV. In other words, such fields have a major effect on electronic systems because the mere field strength of E_{THz}(t) can induce electronic transitions over microscopic scales. One possibility is to use such THz fields to study Bloch oscillations where semiconductor electrons move through the Brillouin zone, just to return to where they started, giving rise to the Bloch oscillations.

The THz sources can be also extremely short, down to single cycle of THz field's oscillation. For one THz, that means duration in the range of one picosecond (ps). Consequently, one can use THz fields to monitor and control ultrafast processes in semiconductors or to produce ultrafast switching in semiconductor components. Obviously, the combination of ultrafast duration and strong peak E_{THz}(t) provides vast new possibilities to systematic studies in semiconductors.

Besides the strength and duration of E_{THz}(t), the THz field's photon energy plays a vital role in semiconductor investigations because it can be made resonant with several intriguing many-body transitions. For example, electrons in conduction band and holes, i.e., electronic vacancies, in valence band attract each other via the Coulomb interaction. Under suitable conditions, electrons and holes can be bound to excitons that are hydrogen-like states of matter. At the same time, the exciton binding energy is few to hundreds of meV that can be matched energetically with a THz photon. Therefore, the presence of excitons can be uniquely detected based on the absorption spectrum of a weak THz field. Also simple states, such as plasma and correlated electron–hole plasma can be monitored or modified by THz fields.

== Terahertz time-domain spectroscopy ==
In optical spectroscopy, the detectors typically measure the intensity of the light field rather than the electric field because there are no detectors that can directly measure electromagnetic fields in the optical range. However, there are multiple techniques, such as antennas and electro-optical sampling, that can be applied to measure the time evolution of E_{THz}(t) directly. For example, one can propagate a THz pulse through a semiconductor sample and measure the transmitted and reflected fields as function of time. Therefore, one collects information of semiconductor excitation dynamics completely in time domain, which is the general principle of the terahertz time-domain spectroscopy.

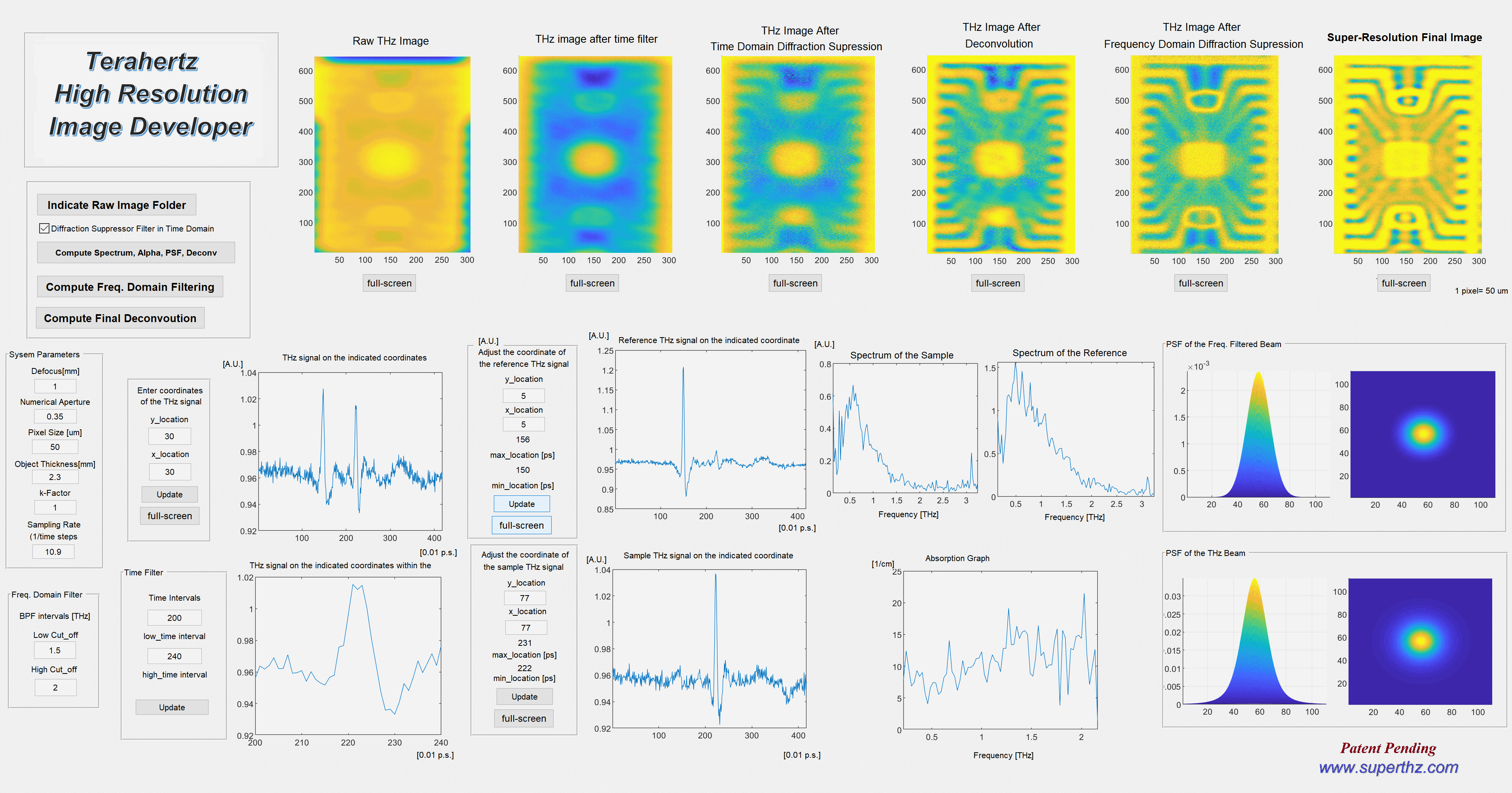
Using Terahertz for developing transmission images of packaged items.

By using short THz pulses, a great variety of physical phenomena have already been studied. For unexcited, intrinsic semiconductors one can determine the complex permittivity or THz-absorption coefficient and refractive index, respectively. The frequency of transversal-optical phonons, to which THz photons can couple, lies for most semiconductors at several THz. Free carriers in doped semiconductors or optically excited semiconductors lead to a considerable absorption of THz photons. Since THz pulses passes through non-metallic materials, they can be used for inspection and transmission of packaged items.

== Frequency-domain spectroscopy ==
Frequency-domain terahertz spectroscopy (THz-FDS) uses continuous-wave terahertz radiation whose frequency is swept across a selected range to measure a material’s amplitude and phase response. In contrast to time-domain terahertz spectroscopy (THz-TDS), which measures broadband pulses and analyzes their temporal waveform, THz-FDS operates directly in the frequency domain.

THz-FDS systems typically rely on photomixing, where two narrow-linewidth near-infrared lasers with a very small frequency offset illuminate an ultrafast photoconductive device (commonly low-temperature-grown GaAs or InGaAs structures). The optical beat frequency generates a continuous-wave terahertz signal. A second photomixer illuminated by the same lasers performs coherent detection, preserving both amplitude and phase of the terahertz field.

A key advantage of THz-FDS is its extremely high spectral resolution, often better than 1 MHz, enabling it to resolve Doppler-limited gas-phase transitions and other very narrow spectral features. This makes THz-FDS particularly powerful for high-precision rotational spectroscopy, phonon studies in solids, and measurement of sharp resonances in semiconductors, superconductors, metamaterials, and thin-film structures. THz-FDS systems also achieve high dynamic range and provide quantitative measurements of absorption and refractive-index spectra.

Although THz-FDS acquires individual frequency points while THz-TDS samples time-delay points, when normalized for bandwidth, spectral resolution, and signal-to-noise ratio, both techniques require comparable total measurement time. Coherent detection in THz-FDS can introduce interference fringes due to optical-path imbalance, but techniques such as optical phase modulation and second-harmonic detection can eliminate these artifacts and recover clean spectra.

== Terahertz-induced plasma and exciton transitions ==
The THz fields can be applied to accelerate electrons out of their equilibrium. If this is done fast enough, one can measure the elementary processes, such as how fast the screening of the Coulomb interaction is built up. This was experimentally explored in Ref. where it was shown that screening is complete within tens of femtoseconds in semiconductors. These insights are very important to understand how electronic plasma behaves in solids.

The Coulomb interaction can also pair electrons and holes into excitons, as discussed above. Due to their analog to the hydrogen atom, excitons have bound states that can be uniquely identified by the usual quantum numbers 1s, 2s, 2p, and so on. In particular, 1s-to-2p transition is dipole allowed and can be directly generated by E_{THz}(t) if the photon energy matches the transition energy. In gallium arsenide-type systems, this transition energy is roughly 4 meV that corresponds to 1 THz photons. At resonance, the dipole d_{1s,2p} defines the Rabi energy Ω_{Rabi} = d_{1s,2p} E_{THz}(t) that determines the time scale at which the 1s-to-2p transition proceeds.

For example, one can excite the excitonic transition with an additional optical pulse which is synchronized with the THz pulse. This technique is called transient THz spectroscopy. Using this technique one can follow the formation dynamics of excitons or observe THz gain arising from intraexcitonic transitions.

Since a THz pulse can be intense and short, e.g., single-cycle, it is experimentally possible to realize situations where duration of the pulse, time scale related to Rabi- as well as the THz photon energy ħω are degenerate. In this situation, one enters the realm of extreme nonlinear optics where the usual approximations, such as the rotating-wave approximation (abbreviated as RWA) or the conditions for complete state transfer, break down. As a result, the Rabi oscillations become strongly distorted by the non-RWA contributions, the multiphoton absorption or emission processes, and the dynamic Franz–Keldysh effect, as measured in Refs.

By using a free-electron laser, one can generate longer THz pulses that are more suitable for detecting the Rabi oscillations directly. This technique could indeed demonstrate the Rabi oscillations, or actually the related Autler–Townes splitting, in experiments. The Rabi splitting has also been measured with a short THz pulse and also the onset to multi-THz-photon ionization has been detected, as the THz fields are made stronger. Recently, it has also been shown that the Coulomb interaction causes nominally dipole-forbidden intra-excitonic transitions to become partially allowed.

== Theory of terahertz transitions ==
Terahertz transitions in solids can be systematically approached by generalizing the semiconductor Bloch equations and the related many-body correlation dynamics. At this level, one realizes the THz field are directly absorbed by two-particle correlations that modify the quantum kinetics of electron and hole distributions. Therefore, a systematic THz analysis must include the quantum kinetics of many-body correlations, that can be treated systematically, e.g., with the cluster-expansion approach. At this level, one can explain and predict a wide range of effects with the same theory, ranging from Drude-like response of plasma to extreme nonlinear effects of excitons.

== See also ==
- Cluster-expansion approach – High-temperature expansion in statistical mechanics
- Elliott formula – Formula for solid emission and absorption
- Semiconductor Bloch equations – Describe the optical response of semiconductors
- Terahertz nondestructive evaluation – Imaging and evaluation using the terahertz domain of electromagnetic radiation
- Ultrafast laser spectroscopy – Spectroscopy with lasers with very short pulses
