= János Hebling =

Hungarian Physicist

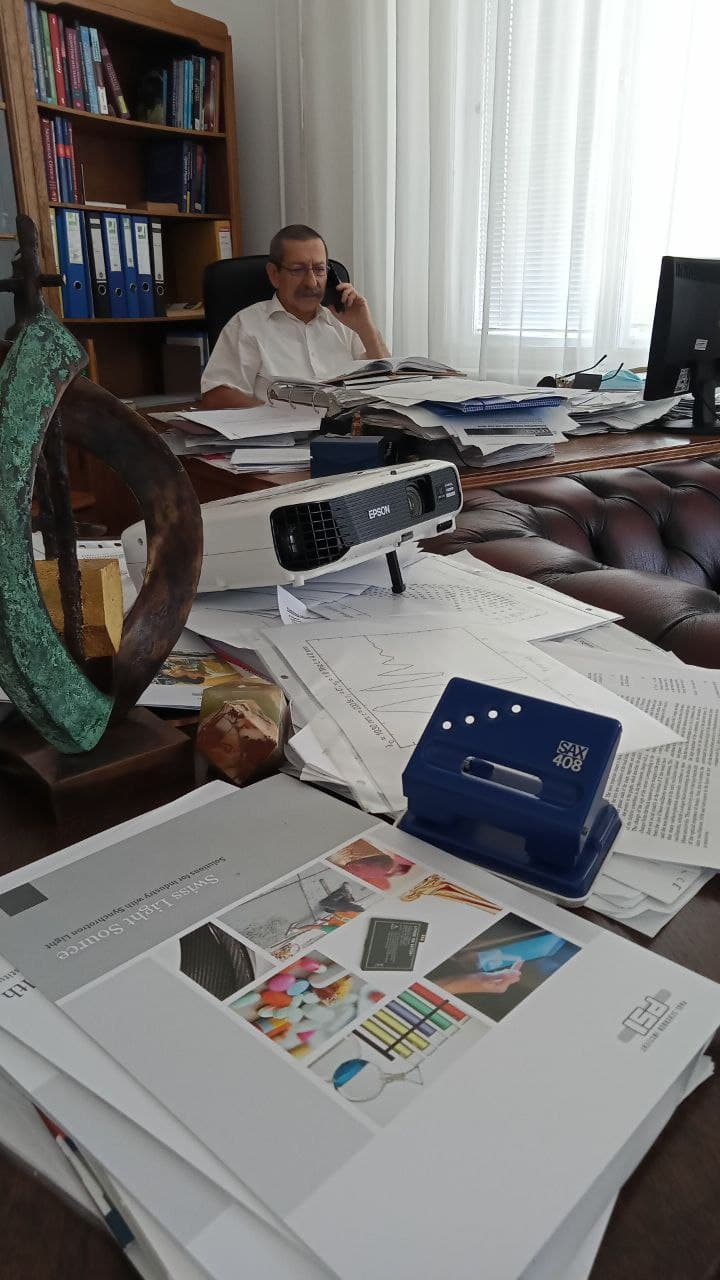
János Hebling in his office (2021).

János Hebling (in Hungarian: Hebling János) is a Hungarian physicist, known for his preliminary works at Terahertz physics and spectroscopy. He was born at Zirc on 9 May 1954 and currently works as a professor at the Institute of Physics at University of Pécs and is an active researcher at the Hungarian Academy of Sciences and ELI.

== Life ==
He graduated from the University of Szeged in 1978 with a degree in physics and then obtained his doctorate in 1981. He became a candidate of physical sciences in 1992 and defended his doctoral dissertation at the Hungarian Academy of Sciences in 2003. Between 2008 and 2018 he was the head of the Institute of Physics at the Faculty of Science of the University of Pécs; since 2012 he has been the head of the MTA-PTE High Intensity Terahertz Research Group, and since 2013 he has been the head of the PTE Doctoral School of Physics. He is well known for his preliminary works on terahertz physics and spectroscopy, laser physics, nonlinear optics, production and application of THz pulses and laser-driven particle accelerators. He was awarded the Széchenyi Prize and the Gábor Dénes prize for his notable contributions in these areas.

== Notable works ==
- Excimer laser development and production technique of short light pulses by excimer laser (1978—1987).
- Production of ultrashort light pulse with a mode-synchronized dye laser, its amplification and its application
- The new production technique of ultrashort light pulses with titanium-sapphire laser and optical parametric oscillator (1988)
- From 1998 he has continued studies about the production of THz pulses using ultrashort laser pulses and its application in solid state physics, biophysics, the theoretical study of optical parametric oscillators, the study of basic optical relations in this frequency regime.
- In 2002 he and his colleagues introduced a technique of velocity matching by pulse front tilting for large area THz-pulse generation
