= SBE =

SBE may refer to:

== Science, medicine, and technology ==
- Sacred Books of the East
- Semiconductor Bloch equations
- Social, behavioral, environmental and medical sciences
- Society of Broadcast Engineers
- Specification by example, in software development
- Subacute bacterial endocarditis

== Engineering consultants ==
- SBE, Studiebureau voor Bouwkunde en Expertises, Sint-Niklaas, Belgium

== Other uses ==
- SBE Entertainment Group, Los Angeles, US
- Scarborough Board of Education, Ontario, Canada
- South by east, a point of the compass
