= Photoluminescence =

Light emission from substances after they absorb photons

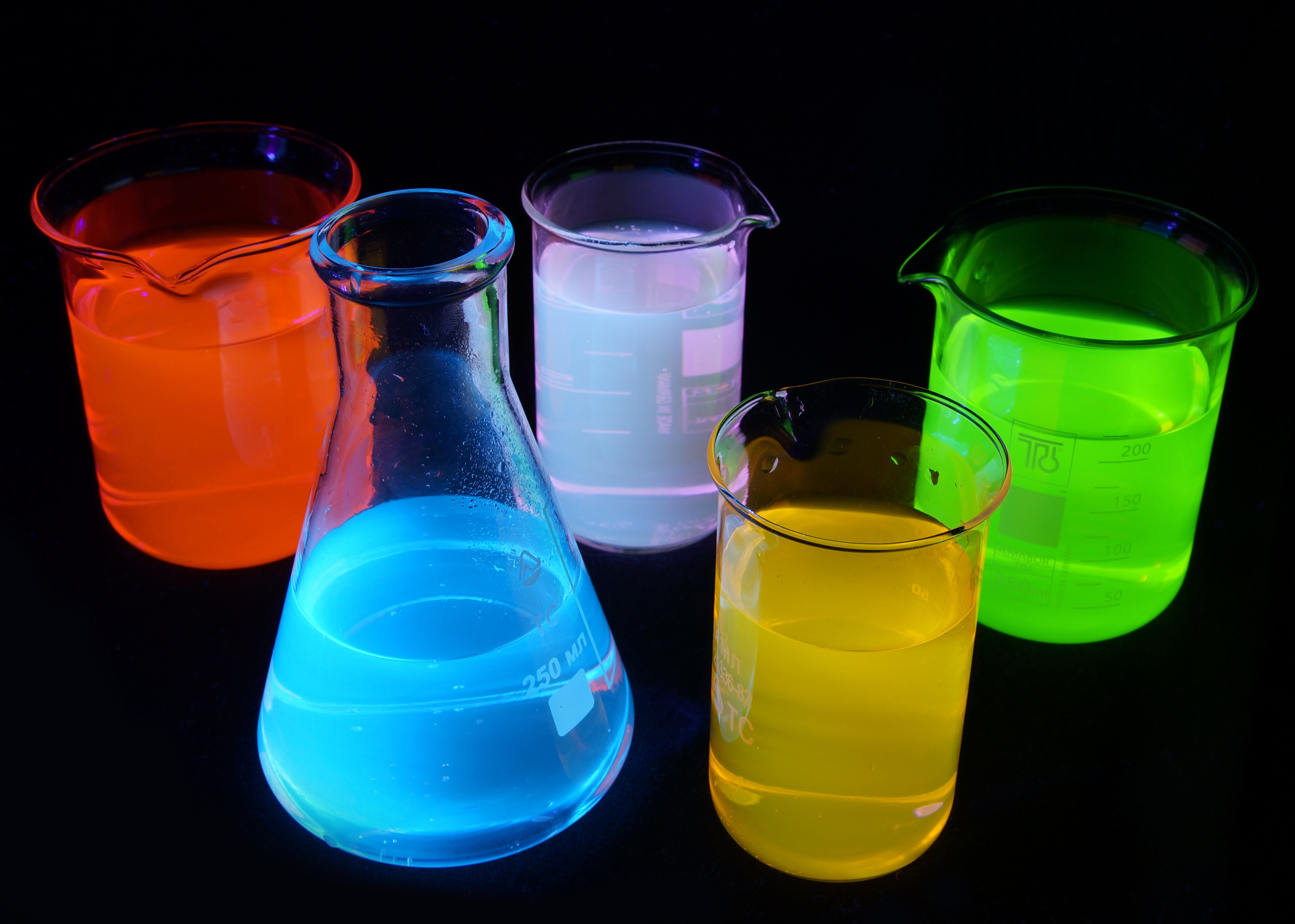
Fluorescent solutions under UV light. Absorbed photons are rapidly re-emitted under longer electromagnetic wavelengths.

Photoluminescence is light emission from matter after absorbing photons. It is a form of luminescence initiated by photoexcitation, where photons excite electrons to a higher energy level in an atom. After excitation, various mechanisms release the absorbed energy as new photons. Time between absorption and emission varies, ranging from femtoseconds for free-carrier plasma in inorganic semiconductors or metals to milliseconds for phosphorescence. Under special circumstances the emission delay can be minutes or hours.

Observation of photoluminescence at a certain energy can be viewed as an indication that an electron transitioned between states separated by this transition energy. While this is generally true in atoms and similar systems, correlations and other more complex phenomena also act as sources for photoluminescence in many-body systems such as semiconductors or metals. A theoretical approach to handle this is given by the semiconductor luminescence equations.

== Forms ==
Schematic for the excitation-relaxation processes of photoluminescence

Photoluminescent processes can be classified by parameters such as the energy of the exciting photon with respect to the emission. Resonant excitation, also known as resonance fluorescence, is where a wavelength of photons is absorbed and the same wavelength is rapidly re-emitted. For gasses or materials in solution, this process involves electrons but no significant internal energy transitions involving molecular features of the chemical substance between absorption and emission. In crystalline inorganic semiconductors where an electronic band structure is formed, secondary emission can be more complicated as events may contain both coherent contributions such as resonant Rayleigh scattering where a fixed phase relation with the driving light field is maintained (i.e. energetically elastic processes where no losses are involved), and incoherent contributions (or inelastic modes where some energy channels into an auxiliary loss mode),

The latter originate, e.g., from the radiative recombination of excitons, Coulomb-bound electron-hole pair states in solids. Resonance fluorescence may also show significant quantum optical correlations.

More processes may occur when a substance undergoes internal energy transitions before re-emitting the energy from the absorption event. Electrons change energy states by either resonantly gaining energy from absorption of a photon or losing energy by emitting photons. In chemistry, fluorescence and phosphorescence are distinguished. The former is typically a fast process, yet some amount of the original energy is dissipated so that re-emitted light photons will have lower energy than did the absorbed excitation photons. The re-emitted photon is red shifted, carrying less energy. For phosphorescence, electrons which absorbed photons, undergo intersystem crossing where they enter into a state with altered spin multiplicity (see term symbol), usually a triplet state. Once the excited electron is transferred into this triplet state, electron transition (relaxation) back to the lower singlet state energies is quantum mechanically forbidden, meaning that it happens much more slowly than other transitions. The result is a slow process of radiative transition back to the singlet state, sometimes lasting minutes or hours. This is the basis for "glow in the dark" substances.

Photoluminescence is an important technique for measuring the purity and crystalline quality of semiconductors such as GaN and InP and for quantification of the amount of disorder present in a system.

Time-resolved photoluminescence is a method where the sample is excited with a light pulse and then the decay in photoluminescence with respect to time is measured. This technique is useful for measuring the minority carrier lifetime of III-V semiconductors like gallium arsenide.

== Photoluminescence properties of direct-gap semiconductors ==
In a typical photoluminescence experiment, a semiconductor is excited with a light-source that provides photons with an energy larger than the bandgap energy. The incoming light excites a polarization that can be described with the semiconductor Bloch equations. Once the photons are absorbed, electrons and holes are formed with finite momenta $\mathbf{k}$ in the conduction and valence bands, respectively. The excitations then undergo energy and momentum relaxation towards the band-gap minimum. Typical mechanisms are Coulomb scattering and the interaction with phonons. Finally, the electrons recombine with holes under emission of photons.

Ideal, defect-free semiconductors are many-body systems where the interactions of charge-carriers and lattice vibrations have to be considered in addition to the light-matter coupling. Photoluminescence is generally extremely sensitive to internal electric fields and to the dielectric environment (such as in photonic crystals) which impose further degrees of complexity. A precise microscopic description is provided by the semiconductor luminescence equations.

=== Ideal quantum-well structures ===
An ideal, defect-free semiconductor quantum well structure is a useful model system to illustrate the fundamental processes in typical photoluminescence experiments. The discussion is based on results published in Klingshirn (2012) and Balkan (1998).

The fictive model structure for this discussion has two confined quantized electronic and two hole sub-bands, e_{1}, e_{2} and h_{1}, h_{2}, respectively. The linear absorption spectrum of such a structure shows the exciton resonances of the first (e1h1) and the second quantum well sub-bands (e_{2}, h_{2}), as well as the absorption from the corresponding continuum states and from the barrier.

==== Photoexcitation ====
The three main excitation conditions are: resonant, quasi-resonant, and non-resonant. For resonant excitation, the central energy of the laser corresponds to the lowest exciton resonance of the quantum well. A negligible amount of the excess energy is injected to the carrier system. For these conditions, coherent processes contribute significantly to the spontaneous emission. The decay of polarization creates excitons directly. Detecting photoluminescence is challenging for resonant excitation as it is difficult to discriminate contributions from the excitation, i.e., stray-light and diffuse scattering from surface roughness. Thus, speckle and resonant Rayleigh-scattering are always superimposed to the incoherent emission.

In case of the non-resonant excitation, the structure is excited with some excess energy. This is the typical situation used in most experiments as the excitation energy can be discriminated using a spectrometer or an optical filter. One has to distinguish between quasi-resonant excitation and barrier excitation.

For quasi-resonant conditions, the energy of the excitation is tuned above the ground state but still below the barrier absorption edge, for example, into the continuum of the first sub-band. The polarization decay for these conditions is much faster than for resonant excitation and coherent contributions to the quantum well emission are negligible. The initial temperature of the carrier system is significantly higher than the lattice temperature due to the surplus energy of the injected carriers. Finally, only the electron-hole plasma is initially created. It is then followed by the formation of excitons.

In case of barrier excitation, the initial carrier distribution in the quantum well strongly depends on the carrier scattering between barrier and the well.

==== Relaxation ====
Initially, the laser light induces coherent polarization in the sample, i.e., the transitions between electron and hole states oscillate with the laser frequency and a fixed phase. Polarization typically de-phases in less than one hundred femtoseconds for non-resonant excitation due to ultra-fast Coulomb- and phonon-scattering.

The dephasing of the polarization leads to creation of populations of electrons and holes in the conduction and the valence bands, respectively. The lifetime of the carrier populations is rather long, limited by radiative and non-radiative recombination such as Auger recombination. During this lifetime a fraction of electrons and holes may form excitons, this topic is still controversially discussed in the literature. The formation rate depends on the experimental conditions such as lattice temperature, excitation density, as well as on the general material parameters, e.g., the strength of the Coulomb-interaction or the exciton binding energy.

The characteristic time-scales are in the range of hundreds of picoseconds in GaAs; they appear to be much shorter in wide-gap semiconductors.

Directly after the excitation with short (femtosecond) pulses and the quasi-instantaneous decay of the polarization, the carrier distribution is mainly determined by the spectral width of the excitation, e.g., a laser pulse. The distribution is thus highly non-thermal and resembles a Gaussian distribution, centered at a finite momentum. In the first hundreds of femtoseconds, the carriers are scattered by phonons, or at elevated carrier densities via Coulomb-interaction. The carrier system successively relaxes to the Fermi–Dirac distribution typically within the first picosecond. Finally, the carrier system cools down under the emission of phonons. This can take up to several nanoseconds, depending on the material system, the lattice temperature, and the excitation conditions such as the surplus energy.

Initially, the carrier temperature decreases fast via emission of optical phonons. This is quite efficient due to the comparatively large energy associated with optical phonons, (36meV or 420K in GaAs) and their rather flat dispersion, allowing for a wide range of scattering processes under conservation of energy and momentum. Once the carrier temperature decreases below the value corresponding to the optical phonon energy, acoustic phonons dominate the relaxation. Here, cooling is less efficient due their dispersion and small energies and the temperature decreases much slower beyond the first tens of picoseconds. At elevated excitation densities, the carrier cooling is further inhibited by the so-called hot-phonon effect. The relaxation of a large number of hot carriers leads to a high generation rate of optical phonons which exceeds the decay rate into acoustic phonons. This creates a non-equilibrium "over-population" of optical phonons and thus causes their increased reabsorption by the charge-carriers significantly suppressing any cooling. Thus, a system cools slower, the higher the carrier density is.

==== Radiative recombination ====
Emission directly after excitation is broad-spectrum, centered near the strongest exciton resonance. As the carrier distribution relaxes and cools, the width of the luminescent peak decreases and the emission energy shifts to match the ground state of the exciton (such as an electron) for ideal samples without disorder. The spectrum approaches its quasi-steady-state shape defined by the distribution of electrons and holes. Increasing the excitation density will change the emission spectra. They are dominated by the excitonic ground state for low densities. Additional peaks from higher sub-band transitions appear as the carrier density or lattice temperature are increased as these states get more and more populated. Also, the width of the main luminescent peak increases significantly with rising excitation due to excitation-induced dephasing and the emission peak experiences a small shift in energy due to the Coulomb-renormalization and phase-filling.

Both exciton populations and plasma, uncorrelated electrons and holes, can act as sources for photoluminescence as described in the semiconductor-luminescence equations. Both yield spectral features which are difficult to distinguish; however their emission dynamics vary significantly. Exciton decay declines exponentially since the probability of their radiative recombination does not depend on the carrier density. The probability of spontaneous emission for uncorrelated electrons and holes, is proportional to the product of electron and hole populations eventually leading to a non-single-exponential decay described by a hyperbolic function.

=== Effects of disorder ===
Real material systems always incorporate disorder. Examples are structural defects in the lattice or disorder due to variations of the chemical composition. Their treatment is extremely challenging for microscopic theories due to the lack of detailed knowledge about perturbations of the ideal structure. Thus, the influence of the extrinsic effects on the luminescence is usually addressed phenomenologically. In experiments, disorder can lead to localization of carriers and hence drastically increase the photoluminescence life times as localized carriers cannot as easily find nonradiative recombination centers as can free ones.

Researchers from the King Abdullah University of Science and Technology have studied the photoinduced entropy (i.e. thermodynamic disorder) of InGaN/GaN p-i-n double-heterostructure and AlGaN nanowires using temperature-dependent photoluminescence. They defined the photoinduced entropy as a thermodynamic quantity that represents the unavailability of a system's energy for conversion into useful work due to carrier recombination and photon emission. They have also related the change in entropy generation to the change in photocarrier dynamics in the nanowire active regions using results from time-resolved photoluminescence study. They hypothesized that the amount of generated disorder in the InGaN layers eventually increases as the temperature approaches room temperature because of the thermal activation of surface states, while an insignificant increase was observed in AlGaN nanowires, indicating lower degrees of disorder-induced uncertainty in the wider bandgap semiconductor. To study the photoinduced entropy, the scientists have developed a mathematical model that considers the net energy exchange resulting from photoexcitation and photoluminescence.

== Photoluminescence from metals ==
Unlike photoluminescence from semiconductors, photoluminescence from metals is much weaker, with a quantum yield an order of magnitude lower. Nevertheless, metal photoluminescence is important for understanding electron structure, population dynamics in metals, and thermometry.

== Photoluminescent materials for temperature detection ==
In phosphor thermometry, the temperature dependence of the photoluminescence process is exploited to measure temperature. Somewhat similarly, anti-Stokes photoluminescence from metals can be used for thermometry.

== Experimental methods ==
Photoluminescence spectroscopy, (or fluorescence spectroscopy in chemistry) is a widely used technique for characterising optical and electronic properties of semiconductors and molecules. The technique is fast, contactless, and non-destructive. It can be used to study the optoelectronic properties of materials from micron to centimeter-scale during fabrication processes without complex sample preparation. For example, photoluminescence measurements of solar cell absorbers can predict the maximum voltage the material can produce. Relaxation processes can be studied using time-resolved fluorescence spectroscopy to find the decay lifetime of the photoluminescence. These techniques can be combined with microscopy, to map the intensity (confocal microscopy) or the lifetime (fluorescence-lifetime imaging microscopy) of the photoluminescence across a sample (e.g. a semiconducting wafer, or a biological sample that has been marked with fluorescent molecules). Modulated photoluminescence is a specific method for measuring the complex frequency response of the photoluminescence signal to a sinusoidal excitation, allowing for the direct extraction of minority carrier lifetime without the need for intensity calibrations. It has been used to study the influence of interface defects on the recombination of excess carriers in crystalline silicon wafers with different passivation schemes.

== See also ==
- Chemiluminescence
- Phosphorescence
