= Gregory Wannier =

Swiss physicist (1911–1983)

- Born: Gregory Hugh Wannier; 30 December 1911; Basel, Switzerland
- Died: 21 October 1983 (aged 71); Oregon, US
- Education: University of Basel
- Known for: Wannier equation Wannier function Wannier–Mott exciton Kramers–Wannier duality Geometrical frustration Transfer-matrix method
- Scientific career
- Fields: Solid-state physics Statistical mechanics
- Workplaces: Bell Labs; Socony-Vacuum Oil Company; University of Oregon
- Doctoral advisor: Ernst Stueckelberg; Eugene Wigner
- Doctoral students: Douglas Hofstadter

Gregory Hugh Wannier (1911–1983) was a Swiss physicist. He developed a complete set of orthogonal functions known as the Wannier functions which became tools of the trade for solid-state theorists. He also had made contributions to ferromagnetic theory via the Ising model. The Kramers–Wannier duality yields the exact location of the critical point for the Ising model on the square lattice.

== Biography ==
Wannier received his physics PhD under Ernst Stueckelberg at the University of Basel in 1935. He worked with Professor Eugene P. Wigner as a post-doc exchange student at Princeton in the academic year 1936/1937 and later taught at several American universities before a stint in industry from 1946 to 1960. After working at Socony-Vacuum Laboratories, he joined Bell Laboratories in 1949. There he was in the Physical Electronics Group with colleagues such as William B. Shockley, Conyers Herring, John Bardeen, Charles Kittel, and Philip W. Anderson.

He returned to academia in 1961 at the University of Oregon, where he retired as professor emeritus in 1977. He published a series of important papers on the properties of crystals, working with graduate students (including Douglas Hofstadter among others) and visiting professors. Additionally, he published widely read textbooks on solid-state theory and statistical mechanics.

He was regarded by many in the department as its most eminent member until his death on October 21, 1983. He was a fellow of the American Physical Society.

== Books ==
- Elements of solid state theory, Cambridge University Press 1959. Elements of solid state chemistry (Wannier, Gregory H.)
- Statistical Physics, Wiley 1966; reprint Dover 1987, 2010

== See also ==
- Hofstadter's butterfly
