= Roger Elliott (physicist) =

British theoretical physicist

Sir Roger James Elliott FRS (8 December 1928 – 16 April 2018) was a British theoretical physicist specialising in the magnetic, semiconductor, and optical properties of condensed matter. He was awarded the Maxwell Medal and Prize, the Guthrie Medal and Prize, and was elected a fellow of the Royal Society. He was awarded honorary doctorates by the universities of Paris, Bath, and Essex.

== Life ==
Born in Chesterfield, Elliott's father was a policeman, who died of tuberculosis when Elliott was three. Elliott was brought up by his mother and three unmarried aunts in Swanwick, Derbyshire. Elliott obtained a DPhil in mathematics and theoretical physics from the University of Oxford in 1952. He was a theoretical physicist specialising in the magnetic, semiconductor, and optical properties of condensed matter. He was a research fellow at the University of California, Berkeley, in 1952–3, then at the Atomic Energy Research Establishment until 1955, when he was appointed to a lectureship at the University of Reading. He returned to the University of Oxford in 1957, where he was the Wykeham Professor of Physics from 1974 until 1988. He was chief executive of Oxford University Press from 1988 to 1993.

The Institute of Physics awarded the Maxwell Medal and Prize jointly to Elliott and Kenneth William Harry Stevens in 1968, and the Guthrie Medal and Prize to Elliott in 1990. Elliott was elected a fellow of the Royal Society in 1976 and knighted in 1987. He has been awarded honorary doctorates by the universities of Paris (1983), Bath (1991), and Essex (1993). Elliott died on 16 April 2018 at the age of 89.

== See also ==
- Elliott formula
