= BBGKY hierarchy =

Set of equations describing the dynamics of a system of many interacting particles

In statistical physics, the Bogoliubov–Born–Green–Kirkwood–Yvon (BBGKY) hierarchy (sometimes called Bogoliubov hierarchy) is a set of equations describing the dynamics of a system of a large number of interacting particles. The equation for an s-particle distribution function (probability density function) in the BBGKY hierarchy includes the (s + 1)-particle distribution function, thus forming a coupled chain of equations. This formal theoretic result is named after Nikolay Bogolyubov, Max Born, Herbert S. Green, John Gamble Kirkwood, and Jacques Yvon.

== Formulation ==
The evolution of an N-particle system in absence of quantum fluctuations is given by the Liouville equation for the probability density function $f_N = f_N(\mathbf{q}_1 \dots \mathbf{q}_N, \mathbf{p}_1 \dots \mathbf{p}_N, t)$ in 6N-dimensional phase space (3 space and 3 momentum coordinates per particle)

$$\frac{\partial f_N}{\partial t} + \sum_{i=1}^N \frac{\mathbf{p}_i}{m} \frac{\partial f_N}{\partial \mathbf{q}_i} + \sum_{i=1}^N \mathbf{F}_i \frac{\partial f_N}{\partial \mathbf{p}_i} = 0,$$

where $\mathbf{q}_i, \mathbf{p}_i$ are the position and momentum for $i$-th particle with mass $m$, and the net force acting on the $i$-th particle is

$$\mathbf{F}_i = -\sum_{j=1 \neq i}^N \frac{\partial \Phi_{ij}}{\partial \mathbf{q}_i} - \frac{\partial \Phi_i^\text{ext}}{\partial \mathbf{q}_i},$$

where $\Phi_{ij}(\mathbf{q}_i, \mathbf{q}_j)$ is the pair potential for interaction between particles, and $\Phi^\text{ext}(\mathbf{q}_i)$ is the external-field potential. By integration over part of the variables, the Liouville equation can be transformed into a chain of equations where the first equation connects the evolution of one-particle probability density function with the two-particle probability density function, second equation connects the two-particle probability density function with the three-particle probability density function, and generally the s-th equation connects the s-particle probability density function

$$f_s(\mathbf{q}_1 \dots \mathbf{q}_s, \mathbf{p}_1 \dots \mathbf{p}_s, t) = \int f_N(\mathbf{q}_1 \dots \mathbf{q}_N, \mathbf{p}_1 \dots \mathbf{p}_N, t) \,d\mathbf{q}_{s+1} \dots d\mathbf{q}_N \,d\mathbf{p}_{s+1} \dots d\mathbf{p}_N$$

with the (s + 1)-particle probability density function:

$$\frac{\partial f_s}{\partial t} + \sum_{i=1}^s \frac{\mathbf{p}_i}{m} \frac{\partial f_s}{\partial \mathbf{q}_i} - \sum_{i=1}^s \left( \sum_{j=1\neq i}^s \frac{\partial \Phi_{ij}}{\partial \mathbf{q}_i} + \frac{\partial \Phi_i^\text{ext}}{\partial \mathbf{q}_i}  \right) \frac{\partial f_s}{\partial \mathbf{p}_i} = (N-s) \sum_{i=1}^s \int \frac{\partial \Phi_{i\,s+1}}{\partial \mathbf{q}_i} \frac{\partial f_{s+1}}{\partial \mathbf{p}_i} \,d\mathbf{q}_{s+1} \,d\mathbf{p}_{s+1}.$$

The equation above for s-particle distribution function is obtained by integration of the Liouville equation over the variables $\mathbf{q}_{s+1} \dots \mathbf{q}_N, \mathbf{p}_{s+1} \dots \mathbf{p}_N$. The problem with the above equation is that it is not closed. To solve $f_s$, one has to know $f_{s+1}$, which in turn demands to solve $f_{s+2}$ and all the way back to the full Liouville equation. However, one can solve $f_s$, if $f_{s+1}$ could be modeled. One such case is the Boltzmann equation for $f_1(\mathbf{q}_1, \mathbf{p}_1, t)$, where $f_2(\mathbf{q}_1, \mathbf{q}_2, \mathbf{p}_1, \mathbf{p}_2, t)$ is modeled based on the molecular chaos hypothesis (Stosszahlansatz). In fact, in the Boltzmann equation $f_2 = f_2(\mathbf{p}_1, \mathbf{p_2}, t)$ is the collision integral. This limiting process of obtaining Boltzmann equation from Liouville equation is known as Boltzmann–Grad limit.

== Physical interpretation and applications ==
Schematically, the Liouville equation gives us the time evolution for the whole $N$-particle system in the form $Df_N=0$, which expresses an incompressible flow of the probability density in phase space. We then define the reduced distribution functions incrementally by integrating out another particle's degrees of freedom $f_s \sim \int f_{s+1}$. An equation in the BBGKY hierarchy tells us that the time evolution for such a $f_s$ is consequently given by a Liouville-like equation, but with a correction term that represents force-influence of the $N-s$ suppressed particles

$$D f_s \propto \text{div}_{\mathbf p} \langle \text{grad}_{\mathbf q}\Phi_{i,s+1}\rangle_{f_{s+1}}.$$

The problem of solving the BBGKY hierarchy of equations is as hard as solving the original Liouville equation, but approximations for the BBGKY hierarchy (which allow truncation of the chain into a finite system of equations) can readily be made. The merit of these equations is that the higher distribution functions $f_{s+2},f_{s+3},\dots$ affect the time evolution of $f_s$ only implicitly via $f_{s+1}.$ Truncation of the BBGKY chain is a common starting point for many applications of kinetic theory that can be used for derivation of classical or quantum kinetic equations. In particular, truncation at the first equation or the first two equations can be used to derive classical and quantum Boltzmann equations and the first order corrections to the Boltzmann equations. Other approximations, such as the assumption that the density probability function depends only on the relative distance between the particles or the assumption of the hydrodynamic regime, can also render the BBGKY chain accessible to solution.

== History ==
s-particle distribution functions were introduced in classical statistical mechanics by J. Yvon in 1935. The BBGKY hierarchy of equations for s-particle distribution functions was written out and applied to the derivation of kinetic equations by Bogoliubov in the article received in July 1945 and published in 1946 in Russian and in English. The kinetic transport theory was considered by Kirkwood in the article received in October 1945 and published in March 1946, and in the subsequent articles. The first article by Born and Green considered a general kinetic theory of liquids and was received in February 1946 and published on 31 December 1946.

== See also ==
- Fokker–Planck equation
- Vlasov equation
- Cluster-expansion approach
