= Trion (physics) =

Bound state of three charged particles

A trion is a bound state of three charged particles. A negatively charged trion in crystals consists of two electrons and one hole, while a positively charged trion consists of two holes and one electron. The binding energy of a trion is largely determined by the exchange interaction between the two electrons (holes). The ground state of a negatively charged trion is a singlet (total spin of two electrons S=0). The triplet state (total spin of two electrons S=1) is unbound in the absence of an additional potential or sufficiently strong magnetic field.

Like excitons, trions can be created by optical excitation. An incident photon creates an exciton, and this exciton binds to an additional electron (hole), creating a trion. The binding time of the exciton to the extra electron is of the same order as the time of exciton formation. This is why trions are observed not only in the emission spectra, but also in the absorption and reflection spectra.

Trion states were predicted theoretically in 1958; First time they were observed experimentally in 1993 in CdTe/Cd_{1−x}Zn_{x}Te quantum wells by Ronald Cox and co-authors, and later in various other semiconductor structures. In recent years, trion states in quantum dots have been actively studied. There are experimental proofs of their existence in nanotubes supported by theoretical studies. Particularly interesting is the study of trions in atomically thin two-dimensional (2D) layers of transition metal dichalcogenides. In such materials, the interaction between the charge carriers is enhanced many times over due to the weakening of the screening

An important property of a trion is that its ground state is a singlet. As a result, in a sufficiently large magnetic field, when all the electrons appear spin-polarised, trions are born under the action of light of only one circular polarization. In this polarization, excitons with the appropriate angular momentum form singlet trion states. Light with the opposite circular polarization can only form triplet states of the trion.

In addition to the formation of bound states, the interaction of excitons with electrons can lead to the scattering of excitons by electrons. In a magnetic field, the electron spectrum becomes discrete, and the exciton states scattered by electrons manifest as the phenomenon of "exciton cyclotron resonance" (ExCR). In ExCR, an incident photon creates an exciton, which forces an additional electron to transfer between Landau level s. The reverse process is called "shake-up". In this case, the recombination of the trion is accompanied by the transition of an additional electron between Landau levels.

Since the energies of an exciton and a trion are close, they can form a coherent bound state in which a trion can "lose" an electron to become an exciton and an exciton can "capture" an electron to become a trion. If there is no time between the loss and capture of the electron for it to dissipate, a mixed state similar to an exciton-polariton is formed. Such states have been reliably observed in quantum wells and monolayers of dichalcogenides.

The exciton-electron interaction in the presence of a dense electron gas can lead to the formation of the so-called "Suris tetron". This is a state of four particles: an exciton, an electron and a hole in the Fermi Sea.
