= Cluster expansion =

High-temperature expansion in statistical mechanics

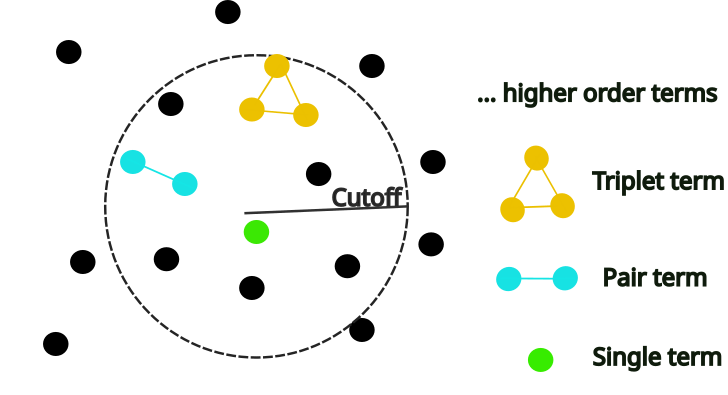
Illustration of the cluster expansion. The black filled circles represent terms in the power series of the partition function. In the cluster expansion, we choose a cutoff and count all the interaction types within this cutoff.

In statistical mechanics, the cluster expansion (also called the high temperature expansion or hopping expansion) is a power series expansion of the partition function of a statistical field theory around a model that is a union of non-interacting 0-dimensional field theories. Unlike the usual perturbation expansion which usually leads to a divergent asymptotic series, the cluster expansion may converge within a non-trivial region, in particular when the interaction is small and short-ranged.

The cluster expansion coefficients are calculated by intricate combinatorial counting. See for a tutorial review.

== Classical case ==
=== General theory ===
In statistical mechanics, the properties of a system of noninteracting particles are described using the partition function. For N non-interacting particles, the system is described by the Hamiltonian
$$H_0 = \sum_{i=1}^N \frac{p_i^2}{2m},$$
and the partition function can be calculated (for the classical case) as
$$\begin{align}
Z_0 &= \frac{1}{h^{3N} N!}\int \prod_i d^3\mathbf{p}_i \, d^3\mathbf{r}_i \exp\left[ -\beta H_0(\{\mathbf{r}_i, \mathbf{p}_i\})\right] \\[1ex]
&= \frac{V^N}{h^{3N} N!}\left( \frac{2\pi m}{\beta} \right)^{{3N}/{2}}.
\end{align}$$
From the partition function, one can calculate the Helmholtz free energy $F_0 = -k_\text{B} T \ln Z_0$ and, from that, all the thermodynamic properties of the system, like the entropy, the internal energy, the chemical potential, etc.

When the particles of the system interact, an exact calculation of the partition function is usually not possible. For low density, the interactions can be approximated with a sum of two-particle potentials:
$$U(\{r_i\}) = \sum_{j=1}^N \sum_{i = 1}^j u_2(|\mathbf{r}_i - \mathbf{r}_j|) =
\sum_{ i,j = 1 \atop i < j}^N u_2(r_{ij}).$$
For this interaction potential, the partition function can be written as

$$Z =Z_0 \ Q,$$
and the free energy is
$$F = F_0 - k_\text{B} T \ln(Q),$$
where Q is the configuration integral:
$$Q = \frac{1}{V^N} \int \prod_i d^3\mathbf{r}_i \exp\left[
-\beta \sum_{j=1}^N \sum_{i=1}^j u_2(r_{ij})
\right].$$

=== Calculation of the configuration integral ===
The configuration integral $Q$ cannot be calculated analytically for a general pair potential $u_2(r)$. One way to calculate the potential approximately is to use the Mayer cluster expansion. This expansion is based on the observation that the exponential in the equation for $Q$ can be written as a product of the form
$$\exp\left[
-\beta \sum_{1\le i<j\le N} u_2(r_{ij})
\right] = \prod_{1 \le i < j \le N} \exp\left[ -\beta u_2(r_{ij}) \right]$$
. Next, define the Mayer function $f_{ij}$ by $\exp\left[ -\beta u_2(r_{ij}) \right] = 1 + f_{ij}$. After substitution, the equation for the configuration integral becomes:

$$Q = \frac{1}{V^N} \int \prod_i d^3\mathbf{r}_i
\prod_{1 \le i < j \le N} \left(1 + f_{ij}\right)$$

The calculation of the product in the above equation leads into a series of terms; the first is equal to one, the second term is equal to the sum over i and j of the terms $f_{ij}$, and the process continues until all the higher order terms are calculated.

$$\prod_{1 \le i < j \le N} \left(1 + f_{ij}\right) =
1 + \sum_{1\le i<j\le N}\; f_{ij} +\sum_{1 \le i < j \le N, 1 \le m < n \le N \atop i < m\ \text{or}\ (i = m\ \text{and}\ j<n)}^N f_{ij} \, f_{mn} + \cdots$$

Each term must appear only once. With this expansion it is possible to find terms of different order, in terms of the number of particles that are involved. The first term is the non-interaction term (corresponding to no interactions amongst particles), the second term corresponds to the two-particle interactions, the third to the two-particle interactions amongst 4 (not necessarily distinct) particles, and so on. This physical interpretation is the reason this expansion is called the cluster expansion: the sum can be rearranged so that each term represents the interactions within clusters of a certain number of particles.

Substituting the expansion of the product back into the expression for the configuration integral results in a series expansion for $Q$:

$$Q = 1 + \frac{N}{V} \alpha_1 + \frac{N \left(N - 1\right)}{2 V^2} \alpha_2 + \cdots.$$

Substituting in the equation for the free energy, it is possible to derive the equation of state for the system of interacting particles. The equation will have the form
$$P V = N k_\text{B} T \left[ 1 + \frac{N}{V}B_2(T) + \frac{N^2}{V^2}B_3(T) + \frac{N^3}{V^3} B_4(T) + \cdots \right],$$
which is known as the virial equation, and the components $B_i(T)$ are the virial coefficients. Each of the virial coefficients corresponds to one term from the cluster expansion ($B_2(T)$ is the two-particle interaction term, $B_3(T)$ is the three-particle interaction term and so on). Keeping only the two-particle interaction term, it can be shown that the cluster expansion, with some approximations, gives the Van der Waals equation.

This can be applied further to mixtures of gases and liquid solutions.

== Quantum mechanics approach ==
The cluster-expansion approach is a technique in quantum mechanics that systematically truncates the BBGKY hierarchy problem that arises when quantum dynamics of interacting systems is solved. This method is well suited for producing a closed set of numerically computable equations that can be applied to analyze a great variety of many-body and/or quantum-optical problems. For example, it is widely applied in semiconductor quantum optics and it can be applied to generalize the semiconductor Bloch equations and semiconductor luminescence equations.

=== Background ===
Quantum theory essentially replaces classically accurate values by a probabilistic distribution that can be formulated using, e.g., a wavefunction, a density matrix, or a phase-space distribution. Conceptually, there is always, at least formally, a probability distribution behind each observable that is measured. Already in 1889, a long time before quantum physics was formulated, Thorvald N. Thiele proposed the cumulants that describe probabilistic distributions with as few quantities as possible; he called them half-invariants. The cumulants form a sequence of quantities such as mean, variance, skewness, kurtosis, and so on, that identify the distribution with increasing accuracy as more cumulants are used.

The idea of cumulants was converted into quantum physics by Fritz Coester and Hermann Kümmel with the intention of studying nuclear many-body phenomena. Later, Jiři Čížek and Josef Paldus extended the approach for quantum chemistry in order to describe many-body phenomena in complex atoms and molecules. This work introduced the basis for the coupled-cluster approach that mainly operates with many-body wavefunctions. The coupled-clusters approach is one of the most successful methods to solve quantum states of complex molecules.

In solids, the many-body wavefunction has an overwhelmingly complicated structure, such that the direct wave-function-solution techniques are intractable. The cluster expansion is a variant of the coupled-clusters approach and it solves the dynamical equations of correlations instead of attempting to solve the quantum dynamics of an approximated wavefunction or density matrix. It is equally well suited to treat properties of many-body systems and quantum-optical correlations, which has made it a very suitable approach for semiconductor quantum optics.

Like almost always in many-body physics or quantum optics, it is most convenient to apply the second-quantization formalism to describe the physics involved. For example, a light field is then described through Boson creation and annihilation operators $\hat{B}^\dagger_\mathbf{q}$ and $\hat{B}_\mathbf{q}$, respectively, where $\hbar\mathbf{q}$ defines the momentum of a photon. The "hat" over $B$ signifies the operator nature of the quantity. When the many-body state consists of electronic excitations of matter, it is fully defined by Fermion creation and annihilation operators $\hat{a}^\dagger_{\lambda,\mathbf{k}}$ and $\hat{a}_{\lambda,\mathbf{k}}$, respectively, where $\hbar\mathbf{k}$ refers to the particle's momentum while $\lambda$ is some internal degree of freedom, such as spin or band index.

=== Classification of N-particle contributions ===
When the many-body system is studied together with its quantum-optical properties, all measurable expectation values can be expressed in the form of an N-particle expectation value

$$\langle \hat{N} \rangle \equiv \langle \hat{B}^\dagger_1 \cdots \hat{B}^\dagger_K \
\hat{a}^\dagger_1 \cdots \hat{a}^\dagger_{N_{\hat{a}}}
\hat{a}_{N_{\hat{a}}} \cdots \hat{a}_{1} \
\hat{B}_{J} \cdots \hat{B}_1
\rangle$$

where $N=N_{\hat{B}} +N_{\hat{a}}$ and $N_{\hat{B}}=J+K$ while the explicit momentum indices are suppressed for the sake of briefness. These quantities are normally ordered, which means that all creation operators are on the left-hand side while all annihilation operators are on the right-hand side in the expectation value. It is straight forward to show that this expectation value vanishes if the amount of Fermion creation and annihilation operators are not equal.

Once the system Hamiltonian is known, one can use the Heisenberg equation of motion to generate the dynamics of a given $N$-particle operator. However, the many-body as well as quantum-optical interactions couple the $N$-particle quantities to $(N+1)$-particle expectation values, which is known as the Bogolyubov–Born–Green–Kirkwood–Yvon (BBGKY) hierarchy problem. More mathematically, all particles interact with each other leading to an equation structure

$$\mathrm{i}\hbar \frac{\partial}{\partial t} \langle\hat{N}\rangle = \mathrm{T}\left[ \langle\hat{N}\rangle \right] + \mathrm{Hi}\left[ \langle\hat{N}+1\rangle \right]$$

where functional $T$ symbolizes contributions without hierarchy problem and the functional for hierarchical (Hi) coupling is symbolized by $\mathrm{Hi}[\langle\hat{N}+1\rangle]$. Since all levels of expectation values can be nonzero, up to the actual particle number, this equation cannot be directly truncated without further considerations.

=== Recursive definition of clusters ===
Schematic representation of the cluster-expansion-based classification. The full correlation is composed of singlets, doublets, triplets, and higher-order correlations, all uniquely defined by the cluster-expansion approach. Each blue sphere corresponds to one particle operator and yellow circles/ellipses to correlations. The number of spheres within a correlation identifies the cluster number.

The hierarchy problem can be systematically truncated after identifying correlated clusters. The simplest definitions follow after one identifies the clusters recursively. At the lowest level, one finds the class of single-particle expectation values (singlets) that are symbolized by $\langle 1\rangle$. Any two-particle expectation value $\langle 2 \rangle$ can be approximated by factorization $\langle 2 \rangle_\mathrm{S} = \langle 1 \rangle \langle 1 \rangle$ that contains a formal sum over all possible products of single-particle expectation values. More generally, $\langle 1 \rangle$ defines the singlets and $\langle N \rangle_\mathrm{S}$ is the singlet factorization of an $N$-particle expectation value. Physically, the singlet factorization among Fermions produces the Hartree–Fock approximation while for Bosons it yields the classical approximation where Boson operators are formally replaced by a coherent amplitude, i.e., $\hat{B} \rightarrow \langle \hat{B} \rangle$. The singlet factorization constitutes the first level of the cluster-expansion representation.

The correlated part of $\langle 2 \rangle$ is then the difference of the actual $\langle 2 \rangle$ and the singlet factorization $\langle 2 \rangle_\mathrm{S}$. More mathematically, one finds

$$\langle 2\rangle = \langle 2\rangle_\mathrm{S} + \Delta \langle 2\rangle$$

where the $\Delta$ contribution denotes the correlated part, i.e., $\Delta \langle 2\rangle = \langle 2\rangle-\langle 2\rangle_\mathrm{S}$. The next levels of identifications follow recursively by applying

$$\begin{align}
\langle 3\rangle &= \langle 3\rangle_\mathrm{S} + \langle 1\rangle\ \Delta \langle 2\rangle +\Delta \langle 3\rangle \,,    \\
\langle N\rangle &=       \langle N\rangle_\mathrm{S} \\
&\quad+ \langle N-2\rangle_\mathrm{S}\ \Delta \langle 2\rangle    \\
&\quad+ \langle N-4\rangle_\mathrm{S}\ \Delta \langle 2\rangle\ \Delta \langle 2\rangle   +\dots\\
&\quad+ \langle N-3\rangle_\mathrm{S}\ \Delta \langle 3\rangle   \\
&\quad+ \langle N-5\rangle_\mathrm{S}\ \Delta \langle 3\rangle\ \Delta \langle 2\rangle   +\dots\\
&\quad+ \Delta\langle N\rangle\,,
\end{align}$$

where each product term represents one factorization symbolically and implicitly includes a sum over all factorizations within the class of terms identified. The purely correlated part is denoted by $\Delta\langle N\rangle$. From these, the two-particle correlations $\Delta \langle 2\rangle$ determine doublets, while the three-particle correlations $\Delta \langle 3\rangle$ are called triplets.

As this identification is applied recursively, one may directly identify which correlations appear in the hierarchy problem. One then determines the quantum dynamics of the correlations, yielding

$$\mathrm{i}\hbar \frac{\partial}{\partial t} \Delta \langle\hat{N}\rangle = \mathrm{T}\left[ \Delta \langle\hat{N}\rangle \right] +
\mathrm{NL} \left[\langle\hat{1}\rangle, \Delta \langle\hat{2}\rangle,\cdots, \Delta \langle\hat{N}\rangle  \right]
+
\mathrm{Hi}\left[ \Delta \langle\hat{N}+1\rangle \right]\,,$$

where the factorizations produce a nonlinear coupling $\mathrm{NL} \left[ \cdots \right]$ among clusters. Obviously, introducing clusters cannot remove the hierarchy problem of the direct approach because the hierarchical contributions remains in the dynamics. This property and the appearance of the nonlinear terms seem to suggest complications for the applicability of the cluster-expansion approach.

However, as a major difference to a direct expectation-value approach, both many-body and quantum-optical interactions generate correlations sequentially. In several relevant problems, one indeed has a situation where only the lowest-order clusters are initially nonvanishing while the higher-order clusters build up slowly. In this situation, one can omit the hierarchical coupling, $\mathrm{Hi}\left[ \Delta \langle\hat{C}+1\rangle \right]$, at the level exceeding $C$-particle clusters. As a result, the equations become closed and one only needs to compute the dynamics up to $C$-particle correlations in order to explain the relevant properties of the system. Since $C$ is typically much smaller than the overall particle number, the cluster-expansion approach yields a pragmatic and systematic solution scheme for many-body and quantum-optics investigations.

=== Extensions ===
Besides describing quantum dynamics, one can naturally apply the cluster-expansion approach to represent the quantum distributions. One possibility is to represent the quantum fluctuations of a quantized light mode $\hat{B}$ in terms of clusters, yielding the cluster-expansion representation. Alternatively, one can express them in terms of the expectation-value representation $\langle [\hat{B}^\dagger]^J \hat{B}^K \rangle$. In this case, the connection from $\langle [\hat{B}^\dagger]^J \hat{B}^K \rangle$ to the density matrix is unique but can result in a numerically diverging series. This problem can be solved by introducing a cluster-expansion transformation (CET) that represents the distribution in terms of a Gaussian, defined by the singlet–doublet contributions, multiplied by a polynomial, defined by the higher-order clusters. It turns out that this formulation provides extreme convergence in representation-to-representation transformations.

This completely mathematical problem has a direct physical application. One can apply the cluster-expansion transformation to robustly project classical measurement into a quantum-optical measurement. This property is largely based on CET's ability to describe any distribution in the form where a Gaussian is multiplied by a polynomial factor. This technique is already being used to access and derive quantum-optical spectroscopy from a set of classical spectroscopy measurements, which can be performed using high-quality lasers.

== See also ==
- BBGKY hierarchy
- Quantum-optical spectroscopy
- Semiconductor Bloch equations
- Semiconductor luminescence equations
