= George Series =

British physicist

- Born: 22 February 1920
- Died: 2 January 1995 (aged 74)
- Known for: Optical spectroscopy of hydrogen
- Spouse: Annette (m. 1948)
- Children: Robert; John; Hugh; Caroline Series; Bertie Baigent (grandson)
- Scientific career
- Thesis: Applications of high resolution spectroscopy to problems of atomic structure (1949)
- Doctoral advisor: Heinrich Gerhard Kuhn

George William Series FRS (22 February 1920 – 2 January 1995) was a British physicist, notable for his work on the optical spectroscopy of hydrogen atoms.

== Early life and education ==
Series was born in Bushey Heath, Hertfordshire, the son of William Series (1892–1959) and his wife Alice (1889–1976), née Crosthwaite. Aged ten he won a scholarship to Queen Mary's Grammar School, Basingstoke, and later to Reading School. In 1938 he was awarded an open scholarship and matriculated at St John's College, Oxford, where he graduated with first class honours in 1947, his studies having been interrupted by the Second World War (during the war Series, a conscientious objector, served with the Friends' Ambulance Unit in Egypt, Italy, and Yugoslavia). He took his MA and DPhil from Oxford in 1950. His PhD thesis is titled Applications of high resolution spectroscopy to problems of atomic structure and his supervisor was Heinrich Gerhard Kuhn.

== Career ==
Series became a university lecturer in 1951 and a fellow of St Edmund Hall in 1954. During this time he studied the structure of the hydrogen atom, becoming 'a world authority on the subject'. In the 1950s and 1960s he exploited techniques developed by Alfred Kastler's research group in Paris and demonstrated that radiation from a coherent superposition of excited states of atoms would display interference effects, known as 'quantum beats'. A group of important papers on this subject brought Series international recognition.

He accepted a chair at Reading University in 1968, which he held until his retirement in 1982. In 1972 Series was the William Evans Visiting Professor at the University of Otago; in 1982 the Indian Academy of Sciences awarded him a Raman Visiting Professorship and he was made an Honorary Fellow in 1984.

Series was elected a fellow of the Royal Society in 1971, and of the Royal Astronomical Society in 1972. In 1982 he received the William F. Meggers award and the medal of the Optical Society of America.

Series died in Oxford in 1995.

== Family ==
Series met his wife Annette (daughter of John Edward Pepper, a civil servant) at Oxford; she read modern languages at St Hilda's College, and they were married on 21 December 1948. They had four children: three sons Robert, John, and Hugh, and a daughter Caroline, who is a notable mathematician and fellow of the Royal Society. His grandson is the conductor and composer Bertie Baigent.

== Selected works ==
- Spectrum of Atomic Hydrogen, 1957
- Laser Spectroscopy and other topics, 1985
- Spectrum of Atomic Hydrogen: advances, 1988
