= Carrier lifetime =

Semiconductor physics terminology

A definition in semiconductor physics, carrier lifetime is defined as the average time it takes for a minority carrier to recombine. The process through which this is done is typically known as minority carrier recombination.

The energy released due to recombination can be either thermal, thereby heating up the semiconductor (thermal recombination or non-radiative recombination, one of the sources of waste heat in semiconductors), or released as photons (optical recombination, used in LEDs and semiconductor lasers). The carrier lifetime can vary significantly depending on the materials and construction of the semiconductor.

Carrier lifetime plays an important role in bipolar transistors and solar cells.

In indirect band gap semiconductors, the carrier lifetime strongly depends on the concentration of recombination centers. Gold atoms act as highly efficient recombination centers, silicon for some high switching speed diodes and transistors is therefore alloyed with a small amount of gold. Many other atoms, e.g. iron or nickel, have similar effect.

== Overview ==
In practical applications, the electronic band structure of a semiconductor is typically found in a non-equilibrium state. Therefore, processes that tend towards thermal equilibrium, namely mechanisms of carrier recombination, always play a role.

Additionally, semiconductors used in devices are very rarely pure semiconductors. Oftentimes, a dopant is used, giving an excess of electrons (in so-called n-type doping) or holes (in so-called p-type doping) within the band structure. This introduces a majority carrier and a minority carrier. As a result of this, the carrier lifetime plays a vital role in many semiconductor devices that have dopants.

== Recombination mechanisms ==
There are several mechanisms by which minority carriers can recombine, each of which subtract from the carrier lifetime. The main mechanisms that play a role in modern devices are band-to-band recombination and stimulated emission, which are forms of radiative recombination, and Shockley-Read-Hall (SRH), Auger, Langevin, and surface recombination, which are forms of non-radiative recombination.

Depending on the system, certain mechanisms may play a greater role than others. Radiative recombination is particularly crucial for light-emitting diodes (LEDs), as it directly determines light generation efficiency; maximizing the fraction of radiative recombination relative to non-radiative pathways is therefore essential for achieving high internal quantum efficiency. In contrast, defect-related Shockley–Read–Hall recombination and Auger recombination reduce carrier lifetime without producing light and thus limit LED performance, especially at high current densities. Advanced time-resolved luminescence techniques have been used to separate and quantify these recombination contributions and their impact on carrier lifetime in optoelectronic materials such as GaN. In photovoltaics, surface recombination plays a significant role in solar cells, where much of the effort goes into passivating surfaces to minimize non-radiative recombination. As opposed to this, Langevin recombination plays a major role in organic solar cells, where the semiconductors are characterized by low mobility. In these systems, maximizing the carrier lifetime is synonymous to maximizing the efficiency of the device.

== Applications ==
=== Solar cells ===
A solar cell is an electrical device in which a semiconductor is exposed to light that is converted into electricity through the photovoltaic effect. Electrons are either excited through the absorption of light, or if the band-gap energy of the material can be bridged, electron-hole pairs are created. Simultaneously, a voltage potential is created. The charge carriers within the solar cell move through the semiconductor in order to cancel said potential, which is the drifting force that moves the electrons. Also, the electrons can be forced to move by diffusion from higher concentration to lower concentration of electrons.

In order to maximize the efficiency of the solar cell, it is desirable to have as many charge carriers as possible collected at the electrodes of the solar cell. Thus, recombination of electrons (among other factors that influence efficiency) must be avoided. This corresponds to an increase in the carrier lifetime. Surface recombination occurs at the top of the solar cell, which makes it preferable to have layers of material that have great surface passivation properties so as not to become affected by exposure to light over longer periods of time. Additionally, the same method of layering different semiconductor materials is used to reduce the capture probability of the electrons, which results in a decrease in trap-assisted SRH recombination, and an increase in carrier lifetime. Radiative (band-to-band) recombination is negligible in solar cells that have semiconductor materials with indirect bandgap structure. Auger recombination occurs as a limiting factor for solar cells when the concentration of excess electrons grows large at low doping rates. Otherwise, the doping-dependent SRH recombination is one of the primary mechanisms that reduces the electrons' carrier lifetime in solar cells.

=== Bipolar junction transistors ===
A bipolar junction transistor is a type of transistor that is able to use electrons and electron holes as charge carriers. A BJT uses a single crystal of material in its circuit that is divided into two types of semiconductor, an n-type and p-type. These two types of doped semiconductors are spread over three different regions in respective order: the emitter region, the base region and the collector region. The emitter region and collector region are quantitively doped differently, but are of the same type of doping and share a base region, which is why the system is different from two diodes connected in series with each other. For a PNP-transistor, these regions are, respectively, p-type, n-type and p-type, and for a NPN-transistor, these regions are, respectively, n-type, p-type and n-type.

For NPN-transistors in typical forward-active operation, given an injection of charge carriers through the first junction from the emitter into the base region, electrons are the charge carriers that are transported diffusively through the base region towards the collector region. These are the minority carriers of the base region. Analogously, for PNP-transistors, electronic holes are the minority carriers of the base region.

The carrier lifetime of these minority carriers plays a crucial role in the charge flow of minority carriers in the base region, which is found between the two junctions. Depending on the BJT's mode of operation, recombination is either preferred, or to be avoided in the base region.

In particular, for the aforementioned forward-active mode of operation, recombination is not preferable. Thus, in order to get as many minority carriers as possible from the base region into the collecting region before these recombine, the width of the base region must be small enough such that the minority carriers can diffuse in a smaller amount of time than the semiconductor's minority carrier lifetime. Equivalently, the width of the base region must be smaller than the diffusion length, which is the average length a charge carrier travels before recombining. Additionally, in order to prevent high rates of recombination, the base is only lightly doped with respect to the emitter and collector region. As a result of this, the charge carriers do not have a high probability of staying in the base region, which is their preferable region of occupation when recombining into a lower-energy state.

For other modes of operation, like that of fast switching, a high recombination rate (and thus a short carrier lifetime) is desirable. The desired mode of operation, and the associated properties of the doped base region must be considered in order to facilitate the appropriate carrier lifetime. Presently, silicon and silicon carbide are the materials used in most BJTs. The recombination mechanisms that must be considered in the base region are surface recombination near the base-emitter junction, as well as SRH- and Auger recombination in the base region. Specifically, Auger recombination increases when the amount of injected charge carriers grows, hence decreasing the efficiency of the current gain with growing injection numbers.

=== Semiconductor lasers ===
In semiconductor lasers, the carrier lifetime is the time it takes an electron before recombining via non-radiative processes in the laser cavity. In the frame of the rate equations model, carrier lifetime is used in the charge conservation equation as the time constant of the exponential decay of carriers.

The dependence of carrier lifetime on the carrier density is expressed as:

$$\frac{1}{\tau_n(N)}= A + BN + CN^2$$

where A, B and C are the non-radiative, radiative and Auger recombination coefficients and $\tau_n(N)$ is the carrier lifetime.

== Measurement ==
Because the efficiency of a semiconductor device generally depends on its carrier lifetime, it is important to be able to measure this quantity. The method by which this is done depends on the device, but is usually dependent on measuring the current and voltage.

In solar cells, the carrier lifetime can be calculated by illuminating the surface of the cell, which induces carrier generation and increases the voltage until it reaches an equilibrium, and subsequently turning off the light source. This causes the voltage to decay at a consistent rate. The rate at which the voltage decays is determined by the amount of minority carriers that recombine per unit time, with a higher amount of recombining carriers resulting in a faster decay. Subsequently, a lower carrier lifetime will result in a faster decay of the voltage. This means that the carrier lifetime of a solar cell can be calculated by studying its voltage decay rate. This carrier lifetime is generally expressed as:

$$\tau = -\frac{k_B T}{q}\left(\frac{dV_{oc}}{dt}\right)^{-1}$$

where $k_B$ is the Boltzmann constant, q is the elementary charge, T is the temperature, and $\frac{dV_{oc}}{dt}$ is the time derivative of the open-circuit voltage.

In bipolar junction transistors (BJTs), determining the carrier lifetime is rather more complicated. Namely, one must measure the output conductance and reverse transconductance, both of which are variables that depend on the voltage and flow of current through the BJT, and calculate the minority carrier transit time, which is determined by the width of the quasi-neutral base (QNB) of the BJT, and the diffusion coefficient; a constant that quantifies the atomic migration within the BJT. This carrier lifetime is expressed as:

$$\tau_{BF} = -\frac{W_B^2}{2D_n}\cdot\frac{G_o}{G_r}$$

where $G_o, G_r, W_B$ and $D_n$ are the output conductance, reverse transconductance, width of the QNB and diffusion coefficient, respectively.

== Current research ==
Because a longer carrier lifetime is often synonymous to a more efficient device, research tends to focus on minimizing processes that contribute to the recombination of minority carriers. In practice, this generally implies reducing structural defects within the semiconductors, or introducing novel methods that do not suffer from the same recombination mechanisms.

In crystalline silicon solar cells, which are particularly common, an important limiting factor is the structural damage done to the cell when the transparent conducting film is applied. This is done with reactive plasma deposition, a form of sputter deposition. In the process of applying this film, defects appear on the silicon layer, which degrades the carrier lifetime. Reducing the amount of damage done during this process is therefore important to increase the efficiency of the solar cell, and a focus of current research.

In addition to research that seeks to optimize currently favoured technologies, there is a great deal of research surrounding other, less-utilized technologies, like the Perovskite solar cell (PSC). This solar cell is preferable due to its comparatively cheap and simple manufacturing process. Modern advancements suggest that there is still ample room to improve on the carrier lifetime of this solar cell, with most of the issues surrounding it being construction-related.

In addition to solar cells, perovskites can be utilized to manufacture LEDs, lasers, and transistors. As a result of this, lead and halide perovskites are of particular interest in modern research. Current problems include the structural defects that appear when semiconductor devices are manufactured with the material, as the dislocation density associated with the crystals is a detriment to their carrier lifetime.
