= Semiconductor optical gain =

How semiconductor lasers work

Optical gain is the most important requirement for the realization of a semiconductor laser because it describes the optical amplification in the semiconductor material. This optical gain is due to stimulated emission associated with light emission created by recombination of electrons and holes. While in other laser materials like in gas lasers or solid state lasers, the processes associated with optical gain are rather simple, in semiconductors this is a complex many-body problem of interacting photons, electrons, and holes. Accordingly, understanding these processes is a major objective as being a basic requirement for device optimization. This task can be solved by development of appropriate theoretical models to describe the semiconductor optical gain and by comparison of the predictions of these models with experimental results found.

== Theory for optical gain in semiconductors ==
Since defining semiconductor's optical gain is an ambitious undertaking, it is useful to build the understanding by steps. The basic requirements can be defined without the major complications induced by the Coulomb interaction among electrons and holes. To explain the actual operation of semiconductor lasers, one must refine this analysis by systematically including the Coulomb-interaction effects.

=== Free-carrier picture ===
For a simple, qualitative understanding of optical gain and its spectral dependency, often so-called free-carrier models are used which is discussed considering the example of a bulk laser here. The term free carrier means that any interactions between the carriers are neglected. A free-carrier model provides the following expression for the spectral dependence $g(\varepsilon)$

$$g(\varepsilon) = g_0 \sqrt{\varepsilon}\, [f^{\mathrm{e}}(\varepsilon) + f^{\mathrm{h}}(\varepsilon) - 1] ~,$$

with the reduced-mass energy $\varepsilon$, the quasi-Fermi-distribution functions for the conduction-band $f^{\mathrm{e}}$ and for the valence-band $f^{\mathrm{h}}$, respectively, and with $g_0$ given by:

$$g_{0}(\varepsilon) = \frac{\nu |\mu(\varepsilon)|^2}{4 \varepsilon_0 \pi n} \left( \frac{2 m_{\mathrm{r}}}{\hbar^2} \right)^{3/2} ~,$$

with $\nu$ being the frequency, $|\mu(\varepsilon)|^2$ the dipole-matrix element, $m_{\mathrm{r}}$ the reduced mass, $\varepsilon_0$ the vacuum permittivity, and $n$ the refractive index.

Thus, the shape of the gain spectrum $g(\varepsilon)$ is determined by the density of states, proportional to $\sqrt{\varepsilon}$, for bulk material and the quasi-Fermi-distribution functions. This expression gives a qualitative impression of the dependence of the gain spectra on the distribution functions. However, a comparison to experimental data shows immediately that this approach is not at all suited to give quantitative predictions on the exact gain values and the correct shape of the spectra. For that purpose, a microscopic model including many-body interactions is required. In recent years, the microscopic many-body model based on the semiconductor Bloch equations (SBE) has been very successful.

=== Microscopic many body gain model ===
The model is based on the SBE describing the dynamics of the microscopic polarizations $p_\mathbf{k}$ between conduction and valence bands, the distribution functions $n_\mathbf{k}$, and the many-body correlations created by the interactions.

If only stationary gain spectra in the linear regime are of interest, one can neglect the time dependence of the distribution functions $f^e_\mathbf{k}$ and $f^h_\mathbf{k}$, and simply express them by quasi-Fermi-distributions for a given carrier density and temperature. The microscopic polarizations are given by:

$$\frac{\mathrm{\partial}}{\mathrm{\partial}t} p_\mathbf{k} = - \mathrm{i}\, \delta_k p_\mathbf{k} - \mathrm{i}\, [1- f^e_\mathbf{k} - f^h_\mathbf{k} ] \Omega_\mathbf{k} - \left. \frac{\mathrm{\partial}}{\mathrm{\partial}t} p_\mathbf{k} \right |_{\mathrm{coll}}$$

where $\delta_\mathbf{k}$ is the renormalized transition energy between conduction and valence bands and $\Omega_\mathbf{k}$ is the renormalized Rabi frequency.

In contrast to the free-carrier description, this model contains contributions due to many-body Coulomb interactions such as $\delta_\mathbf{k}$ and $\Omega_\mathbf{k}$, and the collision term $\left. \frac{\mathrm{\partial}}{\mathrm{\partial}t} p_\mathbf{k} \right |_{\mathrm{coll}}$ that describes the effect of the correlations which may be treated in different approximations. The easiest approach is to replace the collision term by a phenomenological relaxation rate ($T_2$-approximation). However, though this approximation is often used, it leads to somewhat unphysical results like absorption below the semiconductor band gap. A more correct but also much more complex approach considers the collision term kinetically and thus contains in- and out-scattering rates for the microscopic polarizations. In this quantum kinetic approach, the calculations require only the basic input parameters (material band structure, geometrical structure, and temperature) and provide the semiconductor gain and refractive index spectra without further free parameters.

In detail, the above-mentioned equation of motion of the polarization is solved numerically by calculating the first two terms on the right hand side from the input parameters and by computing the collision contributions. Then, the equation of motion is numerically time-integrated and the microscopic polarizations are summed over $\mathbf{k}$ to obtain the complex macroscopic polarization which then provides the gain and the refractive index spectra in semiconductor laser theory. It should be mentioned that present-day modeling assumes a perfect semiconductor structure in order to reduce the numerical effort. Disorder effects like composition variations or thickness fluctuations of the material are not microscopically considered but such imperfections often occur in real structures. Such contributions to inhomogeneous broadening may be included into the theory by convolution with a Gaussian broadening function for quantitative comparison with experimental data.

== Experimental determination of the optical gain ==
The predictive quality of microscopic modeling can be verified or disproved by optical-gain measurements. If the design is approved, one may continue to laser production. If experiments exhibit unexpected gain features, one can refine the modeling by including systematically new effects. As more effects are included, the predictive power of the model increases. In general, a closed-loop design, where the modeling and experiment are replaced cyclically, has proven to be a very efficient method to find and develop new laser designs with desired performance.

=== Stripe-length method ===
Various experimental approaches can be used for the determination of the optical gain of semiconductor structures. For example, the optical stripe-length method is widely applied. This method uses a strong laser source for optical excitation of the sample under investigation. The laser beam is focused to a stripe (e.g., with a cylindrical lens) onto the sample such that the stripe covers the sample but extends to one of its edges. Then, the intensity $I_{\mathrm{ASE}}$ of the amplified spontaneous emission (ASE) of the sample out of this edge is measured as a function of the stripe length $l$. The gain can then be extracted from an appropriate fit of the $I_{\mathrm{ASE}}(l)$ data. The stripe-length method provides reasonable qualitative results for semiconductor samples which have not yet been processed towards electrically pumped laser structures. More quantitatively accurate results, however, are obtained with other methods that require completely processed laser structures that emit in the fundamental lateral mode only as, for example, the Hakki–Paoli method and the transmission method.

=== Hakki–Paoli method ===
For the Hakki–Paoli method, the semiconductor laser has to be operated below the laser threshold. Then, the spectrum of the emitted ASE is strongly governed by the Fabry–Pérot modes of the diode laser resonator. If the length of the device and the reflectivities of the facets are known, the gain can be evaluated from the maxima and the minima of the Fabry–Pérot peaks in the ASE spectrum. This requires, however, that the ASE data are recorded with a spectrometer of sufficient spectral resolution. Then, this method is rather easy and straightforward but it provides gain data only in the regime below the laser threshold while in many cases the gain above the laser threshold would also be of interest, in particular for a quantitative comparison to a theoretical model.

=== Transmission method ===
The transmission method requires a weak broadband light source that spectrally covers the region of interest for the gain spectra. This light source is transmitted through the device of interest and the ratio of the intensities after and before the laser device provides the gain spectra. For this method, the device should operate on the fundamental lateral mode and the occurrence of Fabry–Pérot modes should be suppressed by deposition of at least one antireflection coating on the output facet of the device. In comparison to the stripe-length method and the Hakki–Paoli method, the transmission method provides the most accurate gain data for the widest range of injection currents. The Hakki–Paoli method can be directly compared to calculations within the Semiconductor Bloch equations.

== Comparison of theory and experiment ==
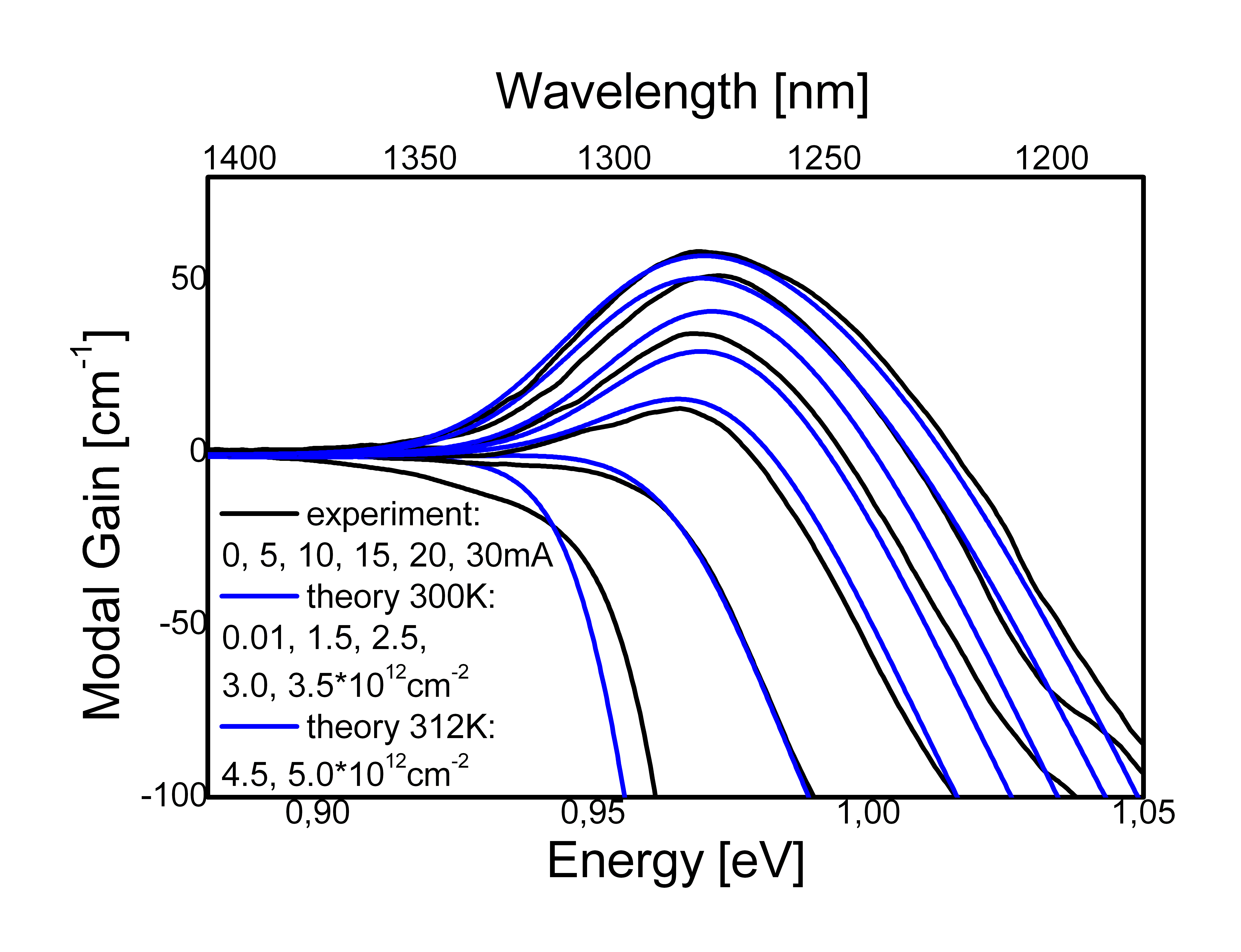
The figure shows a comparison between experimental gain spectra for a (GaIn)(NAs)/GaAs quantum well ridge waveguide laser structure determined with the transmission method with gain spectra calculated with the microscopic many-body model.

The figure shows sets of theoretical and experimental gain spectra for a (GaIn)(NAs)/GaAs quantum-well structure. For the experimental spectra, the injection current was varied while for the theoretical curves different carrier densities were considered. The theoretical spectra were convoluted with a Gaussian function with an inhomogeneous broadening of 19.7 meV. While for the data shown in the figure, the inhomogeneous broadening was adapted for optimum agreement with experiment, it may also unambiguously determined from low-density luminescence spectra of the material under study. Almost perfect quantitative agreement of theoretical and experimental gain spectra can be obtained considering that the device heats up slightly in the experiment at higher injection currents. Thus, the temperature is increased for the gain spectra at higher carrier densities. Note that apart from that, there were no free fitting parameters entering the theory. Accordingly, once the material parameters are known, the microscopic many-body model provides an accurate prediction of the optical gain spectra of any new semiconductor material as, for example, (GaIn)(NAs)/GaAs or Ga(NAsP)/Si.

== See also ==
- Semiconductor laser theory
- Semiconductor Bloch equations
- Lasers
- Stimulated emission
- Semiconductor
- Optical amplifier
- List of laser types
- Population inversion
- Nonlinear theory of semiconductor lasers
