= Janet Mary Salsbury =

Dr. Janet Mary Salsbury (13 May 1881 - 6 March 1951) was a British composer, music educator, and organist.

Salsbury was born in Pershore, Worcester, England. She studied piano at the Royal Academy of Music. In 1910, Salsbury earned a doctorate in music at the University of Durham. She was a Licentiate of the Royal Academy of Music (LRAM) and a Fellow of the Royal College of Organists (FRCO).

Salsbury worked as an organist and professor of music at Ladies College in Cheltenham, England.

She also taught music via a correspondence (mail order) course, and was an examiner in music theory for Trinity College London.

Salsbury’s works were published by the Clayton F. Summy Company, Stainer & Bell, Joseph Williams, and Weekes & Company. Her publications included:

== Books ==
- A Short and Concise Analysis of Mozart's 22 Pianoforte Sonatas
- Staff Sight Singing Tests Books 1 & 2

== Vocal ==
- Ballad of Evesham (chorus)
- Christmas Carols
- From Shakespeare’s Garden: A Set of Songs (voice and piano)
- O Sing Unto the Lord (chorus)
