= Bertie Baigent =

British musician (born 1995)

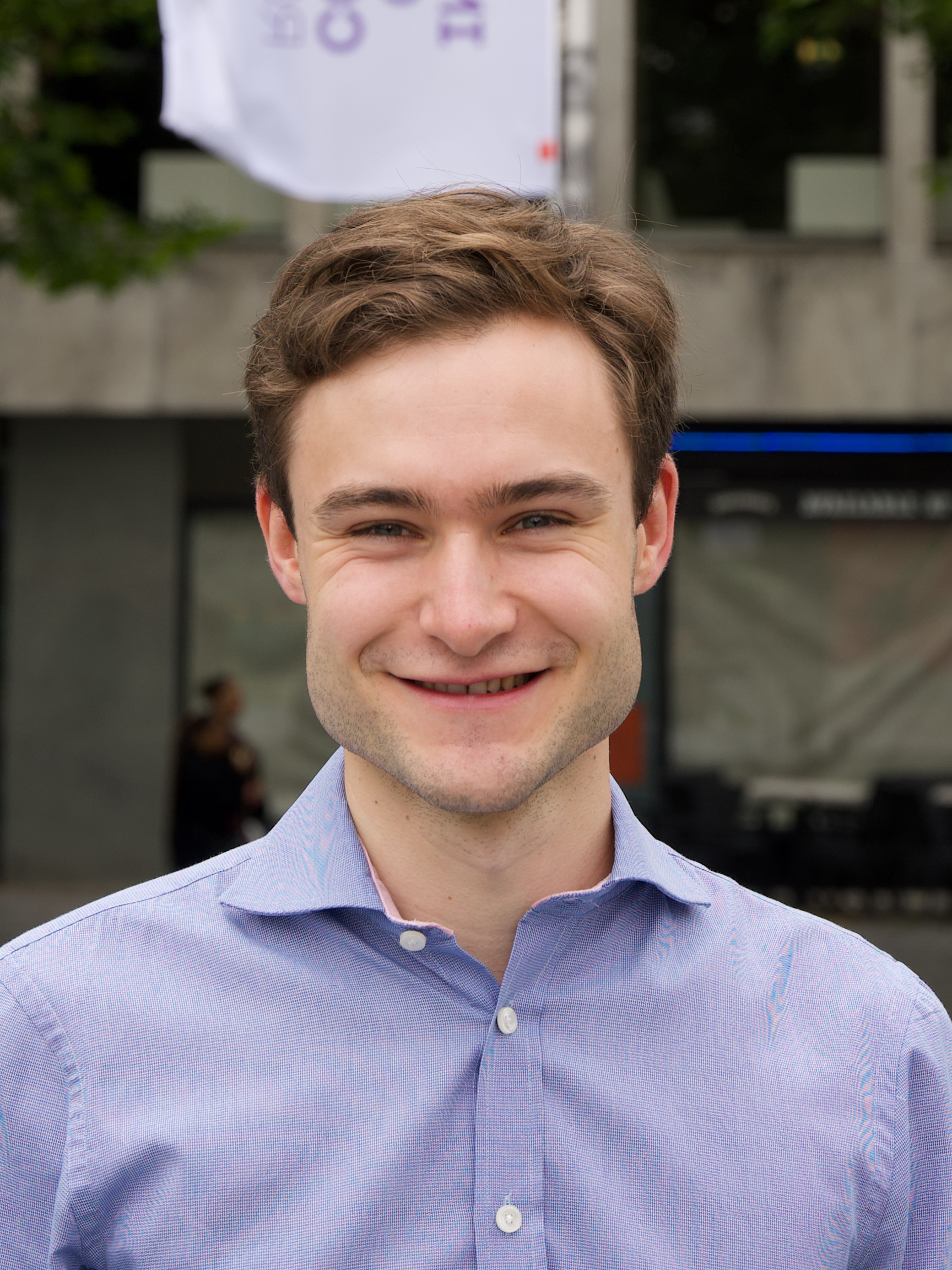
- Baigent in 2022
- Born: 26 March 1995 (age 31); Oxford, England
- Education: Jesus College, Cambridge; Royal Academy of Music
- Era: Contemporary
- Relatives: George Series (grandfather); Caroline Series (aunt)

Robert Edward Series "Bertie" Baigent (born 26 March 1995) is a British conductor, composer, and organist.

== Biography ==
Baigent's aunt is the mathematician Caroline Series. His grandfather was the physicist George Series. Baigent read music at Jesus College, Cambridge, where he was an organ scholar (2013) and where his teachers included Benjamin Walton. He subsequently completed an MA at the Royal Academy of Music in 2018, where his instructors included Sian Edwards.

=== Conducting career ===
Baigent was conductor of the Cambridge University Symphony Orchestra, and subsequently of the London Young Sinfonia from 2016 to 2018. Baigent has been music director of Waterperry Opera Festival since 2017. From 2018 until 2020, he was the assistant conductor of the Colorado Symphony and principal guest conductor of the Denver Young Artists Orchestra.

In February 2022, the City of Birmingham Symphony Orchestra appointed Baigent as one of its new roster of six assistant conductors. In June 2022, Baigent was awarded the Grand Prix for the best overall performance at the inaugural International Conducting Competition Rotterdam, as well as winning the Classical Award and the Symphony Award. Subsequently, also in June 2022, the Rotterdam Philharmonic Orchestra appointed Baigent as its new assistant conductor.

As a guest conductor, Baigent has appeared with the London Philharmonic Orchestra, Royal Scottish National Orchestra, St. Louis Symphony Orchestra, the Orchestra of the Teatro Regio di Torino and the New Japan Philharmonic. In June 2023, he made his debut at the Glyndebourne Festival.

=== Compositional career ===
Baigent has won prizes in numerous composition competitions, including the Stainer and Bell Award for Choral Composition, the BBC Inspire Competition 2013, and the NCEM Young Composers Award. His work Joie de Vivre was commissioned for and played at the unveiling of a plaque to mark the first performance of Beethoven's Ninth Symphony in the City of Westminster. Baigent's compositions have been performed by the Orchestra of the Royal Opera House under Antonio Pappano, the Aurora Orchestra under Nicholas Collon, the Bath Philharmonia and Fretwork. In 2015, a recording of his organ work Bright spark, shot from a brighter place was released by the German CD label JUBAL. His opera Paradise Lost, based on Milton’s eponymous epic poem, premiered in London in August 2022.
