= Robert Cocks & Co. =

Robert Cocks & Co. was a London-based music publisher founded in 1823 by Robert Cocks (12 October 1797, in Norfolk, England – 7 April 1887, in London). The catalog of publications, before Robert Cocks died, is said to have exceeded sixteen thousand, and included many important treatises. When Cocks died, he was believed to be the oldest music publisher in the world. The firm introduced in London pianists Carl Czerny, Julius Schulhoff, and Alexander Dreyschock and published Rimbault and Hopkins' history of the organ and also published pedagogical repertoire for the so-call "Schools" of Spohr, Czerny, Marx, Albrechtsberger, Reicha, and Cherubini.

== Succession of ownership ==
In 1868 Robert Cocks took into partnership his two sons, Arthur Lincoln Cocks (1830–1863) and Stroud Lincoln Cocks (1832–1907). Since Arthur's partnership was acquired posthumously, Arthur's son, Robert Macfarlane Cocks (1852–1934) carried on Arthur's interest. Robert Macfarlane Cocks and Strould Lincoln Cocks began selling the firm in the last quarter of 1898. George Augener (1830–1915) was the buyer. The acquisition was completed in 1904 and from henceforth was known as Augener & Co., Ltd. Eventually the company became a division of Stainer & Bell.

== Selected early publications ==
- "Selection 54," from Der Freyschutz (opera), in oblong quarto books for the flute, arranged by Charles Saust (born 1773) (1925); OCLC 48587382
- "Selection 55," from Scotch Airs, in oblong quarto books for the flute, arranged by Charles Saust (born 1773) (1825); OCLC 48587005
- Gems of Ireland: 200 Airs, Containing the Most Popular of Moore's Melodies, All The National Airs, and the Celebrated Melodies of Carolan, Connolan, etc., Op. 45, by John Clinton (1810–1864) (1840); OCLC 23696155
- The Organ: Its History and Construction, by Edward Francis Rimbault and Edward John Hopkins (1855); OCLC 7908562
