= Augener & Co. =

- Company type: Private
- Industry: Music publishing
- Founded: 1855
- Founder: George Augener
- Fate: Acquired by Galaxy Music Corporation
- Successor: Stainer & Bell
- Headquarters: London, England
- Products: Sheet music, music books, educational music publications, periodicals
- Parent: Schott & Co. Ltd. (1910–1914)

Augener & Co. was a music-publishing business in London, established by George Augener (1830–1915), originally "Georg", a German national born in Fechenheim near Frankfurt am Main, who had previously been an apprentice with André's publishing house in Offenbach.

== History ==
The business was founded at 86 Newgate Street, London, in 1855. Later on, London branch warehouses were established at 1 Foubert Place, 22 Golden Square, 81 The Quadrant, Regent Street, and in Brighton at 1 Palace Place. By a change of partnership on 26 February 1887, the warehouse in the Quadrant was transferred to Wesley S. B. Woolhouse, while the general business with this exception remaining George Augener's.

In the late 19th century, Augener & Co.'s catalogue contained upwards of 6,000 works, of which nearly 1,000 were cheap volumes. The catalogue included a comprehensive collection of pianoforte classics edited by Ernst Pauer, as well as a series of educational works edited by Pauer, by John Farmer, and other well-known musicians. To this collection, they added the works of composers of the New German School, including Xaver Scharwenka, Jean L. Nicodé, and Moszkowski. They had a large and varied stock of music and were the sole agency for the UK of the famous Edition Peters published at Leipzig.

They also published The Monthly Musical Record, a journal which had among its contributors prominent names in English musical literature. At the end of the century, its circulation was about 6,000.

Between 1898 and 1904, Augener purchased Robert Cocks & Co. from Robert Cocks's descendants, Robert Macfarlane Cocks and Strould Lincoln Cocks.

== Company acquisitions ==
George Augener retired in 1910. Although Schott and Co. Ltd., a subsidiary of the music publishing group Schott, acquired the company, as a German-owned business, it was expropriated at the outbreak of World War I (1914). Schott retained the copyright to the editions they had previously acquired.

In 1960 and 1961, the firm acquired the catalogues of UK publishers Joseph Weekes and Joseph Williams. In 1962, Augener & Co. was sold to Galaxy Music of New York and became a division of Galaxy's UK subsidiary, Galliard Ltd., which in turn was sold to Stainer & Bell in 1972.

Correspondence between Augener and music publishing houses in Leipzig from the first half of the 20th century is stored in the Saxon State Archives in Leipzig.
