= Stainer & Bell =

British sheet music publisher

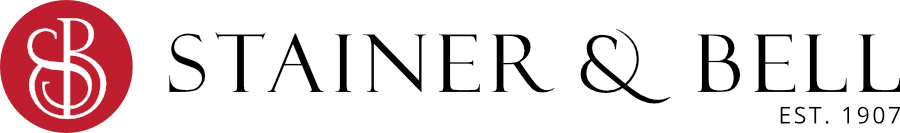
- Founded: 1907
- Founder: Sydney Bransgrove, Albert Lucas Fransella, Richard Henry Walthew, George Francis Geaussant, Isabel Gertrude Geaussant, and George Riley
- Headquarters location: Victoria House; 23 Gruneisen Road; Finchley; London
- Key people: Joint managing directors: Carol and Keith Wakefield
- Publication types: Sheet music
- Official website: www.stainer.co.uk

Stainer & Bell Limited is a British music publisher, specialized in classical sheet music.

== History ==
Stainer & Bell was founded in 1907. In 1917, Stainer & Bell was appointed publisher of the Carnegie Edition. Stainer & Bell acquired Augener & Co. (which had previously acquired music publisher Joseph Williams, founded 1840) and Galliard.

In 1991, the company moved to Victoria House in Finchley Central.

== Catalogue ==
Stainer & Bell publishes a broad selection of predominantly British music, including the following composers:

- Contemporary composers: Bertie Baigent and Philip Moore
- 20th century composers: Charles Villiers Stanford, Gustav Holst, Beryl Price, Janet Mary Salsbury, Ralph Vaughan Williams, Hope Squire, and Herbert Howells.
- Earlier composers: Henry VIII, William Byrd, and Henry Purcell.
- Percussion composers: David Hext, Jack Richards, Brian Stones, Tony Stockley, Andrew McBirnie.

== See also ==
- Robert Cocks & Co.
