= Laser diode rate equations =

The laser diode rate equations model the electrical and optical performance of a laser diode. This system of ordinary differential equations relates the number or density of photons and charge carriers (electrons) in the device to the injection current and to device and material parameters such as carrier lifetime, photon lifetime, and the optical gain.

The rate equations may be solved by numerical integration to obtain a time-domain solution, or used to derive a set of steady state or small signal equations to help in further understanding the static and dynamic characteristics of semiconductor lasers.

The laser diode rate equations can be formulated with more or less complexity to model different aspects of laser diode behavior with varying accuracy.

== Multimode rate equations ==
In the multimode formulation, the rate equations model a laser with multiple optical modes. This formulation requires one equation for the carrier density, and one equation for the photon density in each of the optical cavity modes:

$$\frac{dN}{dt} = \frac{I}{eV} - \frac{N}{\tau_n} - \sum_{\mu=1}^{\mu=M}\Gamma_\mu G_\mu P_\mu$$
$$\frac{dP_\mu}{dt} = (\Gamma_\mu G_\mu - \frac{1}{\tau_p})P_\mu + \beta_\mu \frac{N}{\tau_r}$$

where: ${N}$ is the carrier density, ${P}$ is the photon density, ${I}$ is the applied current, ${e}$ is the elementary charge, ${V}$ is the volume of the active region, ${\tau_n}$ is the carrier lifetime, ${G}$ is the gain coefficient (s^{−1}), ${\Gamma}$ is the confinement factor, ${\tau_p}$ is the photon lifetime, ${\beta}$ is the spontaneous emission factor, ${\tau_r}$ is the radiative recombination time constant, ${M}$ is the number of modes modelled, μ is the mode number, and subscript ${\mu}$ has been added to ${G}$, ${\Gamma}$, and ${\beta}$ to indicate these properties may vary for the different modes.

The first term on the right side of the carrier rate equation is the injected electrons rate (${I/eV}$), the second term is the carrier depletion rate due to all recombination processes (described by the decay time ${\tau_n}$) and the third term is the carrier depletion due to stimulated recombination, which is proportional to the photon density and medium gain.

In the photon density rate equation, the first term ${\Gamma_\mu G_\mu P_\mu}$ is the rate at which photon density increases due to stimulated emission (the same term in carrier rate equation, with positive sign and multiplied for the confinement factor ${\Gamma}$), the second term is the rate at which photons leave the cavity, for internal absorption or exiting the mirrors, expressed via the decay time constant ${\tau_p}$ and the third term is the contribution of spontaneous emission from the carrier radiative recombination into the laser mode.

== The modal gain ==
${G_\mu}$, the gain of the $\mu$^{th} mode, can be modelled by a parabolic dependence of gain on wavelength as follows:

$$G_\mu = \frac{\alpha N [1-(2\frac{\lambda(t)-\lambda_\mu}{\delta\lambda_g})^2] - \alpha N_0}{1 + \epsilon \sum_{\mu=1}^{\mu=M}P_\mu}$$

where: ${\alpha}$ is the gain coefficient and ε is the gain compression factor (see below). ${\lambda_\mu}$ is the wavelength of the $\mu$^{th} mode, $\delta\lambda_g$ is the full width at half maximum (FWHM) of the gain curve, the centre of which is given by

$$\lambda(t)=\lambda_0 + \frac{k(N_{th} - N(t))}{N_{th}}$$

where $\lambda_0$ is the centre wavelength for ${N = N_{th}}$ and k is the spectral shift constant (see below). $N_{th}$ is the carrier density at threshold and is given by

$$N_{th}=N_{tr} + \frac{1}{\alpha\tau_p\Gamma}$$

where $N_{tr}$ is the carrier density at transparency.

$\beta_{\mu}$ is given by

$$\beta_\mu=\frac{\beta_0}{1+(2(\lambda_s-\lambda_\mu)/\delta\lambda_s)^2}$$

where

$\beta_{0}$ is the spontaneous emission factor, $\lambda_s$ is the centre wavelength for spontaneous emission and $\delta\lambda_s$ is the spontaneous emission FWHM. Finally, $\lambda_{}$ is the wavelength of the $\mu$^{th} mode and is given by

$$\lambda_\mu=\lambda_0 - \mu\delta\lambda + \frac{(n-1)\delta\lambda}{2}$$

where $\delta\lambda$ is the mode spacing.

== Gain Compression ==
The gain term, $G$, cannot be independent of the high power densities found in semiconductor laser diodes. There are several phenomena which cause the gain to 'compress' which are dependent upon optical power. The two main phenomena are spatial hole burning and spectral hole burning.

Spatial hole burning occurs as a result of the standing wave nature of the optical modes. Increased lasing power results in decreased carrier diffusion efficiency which means that the stimulated recombination time becomes shorter relative to the carrier diffusion time. Carriers are therefore depleted faster at the crest of the wave causing a decrease in the modal gain.

Spectral hole burning is related to the gain profile broadening mechanisms such as short intraband scattering which is related to power density.

To account for gain compression due to the high power densities in semiconductor lasers, the gain equation is modified such that it becomes related to the inverse of the optical power. Hence, the following term in the denominator of the gain equation :

$$1 + \epsilon \sum_{\mu=1}^{\mu=M}P_\mu$$

== Spectral Shift ==
Dynamic wavelength shift in semiconductor lasers occurs as a result of the change in refractive index in the active region during intensity modulation. It is possible to evaluate the shift in wavelength by determining the refractive index change of the active region as a result of carrier injection. A complete analysis of spectral shift during direct modulation found that the refractive index of the active region varies proportionally to carrier density and hence the wavelength varies proportionally to injected current.

Experimentally, a good fit for the shift in wavelength is given by:

$$\delta\lambda=k\left(\sqrt{\frac{I_0}{I_{th}}}-1\right)$$

where $I_0$ is the injected current and $I_{th}$ is the lasing threshold current.
