= International Conducting Competition Rotterdam =

Music competition in the Netherlands

- Genre: Classical
- Venue: De Doelen
- Locations: Rotterdam, Netherlands
- Inaugurated: 1-3 June 2022
- Participants: 6
- Prize money: €25,000
- Website: iccr.nl

The International Conducting Competition Rotterdam (ICCR) is a conducting competition held every three years in Rotterdam, the Netherlands.

The competition offers young conductors opportunity to gain experience, because it is usually difficult for them to get access to an orchestra. For each competition, six conductors are selected to compete. Applicants can be of any nationality, but need to be between 22 and 30 years of age. After the selection, the six participants have a year-long training program. After this program, the main competition event begins. The participants compete in five rounds, each consisting of multiple rehearsals and a concert. Tickets can be bought for both the concert and the rehearsals. Every round has a different genre and orchestra. The genres of the rounds are proms, contemporary, classical, opera, and great symphonic works. Participating orchestras include the Orchestra of the Eighteenth Century, Sinfonia Rotterdam, Klangforum Wien and the Rotterdam Philharmonic Orchestra. The event is presented by pianist Christiaan Kuyvenhoven. At the end of the competition, a prize is assigned for each round, and also a grand prize for the best allrounder.

The event was initiated by former Concertgebouw director Martijn Sanders and is organised in cooperation with the Rotterdam Philharmonic Orchestra and De Doelen. It is a member of the World Federation of International Music Competitions.

The first edition was held in June 2022, with a selection in 2021. The second edition was held in June 2025, with the selection taking place in June 2024. The third edition will be in the summer of 2028, with a selection round in July 2027.

== Finalists and winners ==
=== First edition (2022) ===
The first edition of the competition had 165 applicants from 50 countries, of which six finalists were selected: Bertie Baigent, Chloe Rooke, Martijn Dendievel, Luis Toro Araya, Joel Sandelson and Carlos Ágreda. One of the featured pieces was Night Flight commissioned from Dutch composer Joey Roukens. The first prize for Best Allrounder was awarded to Bertie Baigent.

=== Second edition (2025) ===
The second edition included a semi-final where 24 selected participants conducted live in Rotterdam. The commissioned piece was A Portrait of Six Conductors by Mathilde Wantenaar. The six finalists were Luis Castillo Briceño, Yukuang Jin, Jakub Przybycień, Rodrigo Sámano Albarrán, Miguel Sepúlveda and Sam Weller. The joint winners of the Best Allrounder prize were Luis Castillo Briceño and Miguel Sepúlveda.
