= Quantum beats =

In physics, quantum beats are simple examples of phenomena that cannot be described by semiclassical theory, but can be described by fully quantized calculation, especially quantum electrodynamics. In semiclassical theory (SCT), there is an interference or beat note term for both V-type and $\Lambda$-type atoms. However, in the quantum electrodynamic (QED) calculation, V-type atoms have a beat term but $\Lambda$-types do not. This is strong evidence in support of quantum electrodynamics.

== Historical overview ==
The observation of quantum beats was first reported by A.T. Forrester, R.A. Gudmundsen and P.O. Johnson in 1955, in an experiment that was performed on the basis of an earlier proposal by A.T. Forrester, W.E. Parkins and E. Gerjuoy. This experiment involved the mixing of the Zeeman components of ordinary incoherent light, that is, the mixing of different components resulting from a split of the spectral line into several components in the presence of a magnetic field due to the Zeeman effect. These light components were mixed at a photoelectric surface, and the electrons emitted from that surface then excited a microwave cavity, which allowed the output signal to be measured in dependence on the magnetic field.

Since the invention of the laser, quantum beats can be demonstrated by using light originating from two different laser sources. In 2017 quantum beats in single photon emission from the atomic collective excitation have been observed. Observed collective beats were not due to superposition of excitation between two different energy levels of the atoms, as in usual single-atom quantum beats in $V$-type atoms. Instead, single photon was stored as excitation of the same atomic energy level, but this time two groups of atoms with different velocities have been coherently excited. These collective beats originate from motion between entangled pairs of atoms, that acquire relative phase due to Doppler effect.

== V-type and $\Lambda$-type atoms ==
There is a figure in Quantum Optics that describes $V$-type and $\Lambda$-type atoms clearly.

Simply, V-type atoms have 3 states: $|a\rangle$, $|b\rangle$, and $|c\rangle$. The energy levels of $|a\rangle$ and $|b\rangle$ are higher than that of $|c\rangle$. When electrons in states $|a\rangle$ and :$|b\rangle$ subsequently decay to state $|c\rangle$, two kinds of emission are radiated.

In $\Lambda$-type atoms, there are also 3 states: $|a\rangle$, $|b\rangle$, and :$|c\rangle$. However, in this type, $|a\rangle$ is at the highest energy level, while $|b\rangle$ and :$|c\rangle$ are at lower levels. When two electrons in state $|a\rangle$ decay to states $|b\rangle$ and :$|c\rangle$, respectively, two kinds of emission are also radiated.

The derivation below follows the reference Quantum Optics.

== Calculation based on semiclassical theory ==
In the semiclassical picture, the state vector of electrons is

$$|\psi(t)\rangle=c_aexp(-i\omega_at)|a\rangle+c_bexp(-i\omega_bt)|b\rangle+c_cexp(-i\omega_ct)|c\rangle$$.

If the nonvanishing dipole matrix elements are described by

$\mathcal{P}_{ac}=e\langle a|r|c\rangle, \mathcal{P}_{bc}=e\langle b|r|c\rangle$ for V-type atoms,
$\mathcal{P}_{ab}=e\langle a|r|b\rangle, \mathcal{P}_{ac}=e\langle a|r|c\rangle$ for $\Lambda$-type atoms,

then each atom has two microscopic oscillating dipoles

$P(t)=\mathcal{P}_{ac}(c_a^*c_c)exp(i\nu_1t)+\mathcal{P}_{bc}(c_b^*c_c)exp(i\nu_2t)+c.c.$ for V-type, when $\nu_1=\omega_a-\omega_c, \nu_2=\omega_b-\omega_c$,
$P(t)=\mathcal{P}_{ab}(c_a^*c_b)exp(i\nu_1t)+\mathcal{P}_{ac}(c_a^*c_c)exp(i\nu_2t)+c.c.$ for $\Lambda$-type, when $\nu_1=\omega_a-\omega_b, \nu_2=\omega_a-\omega_c$.

In the semiclassical picture, the field radiated will be a sum of these two terms

$$E^{(+)}=\mathcal{E}_1exp(-i\nu_1t)+\mathcal{E}_2exp(-i\nu_2t)$$,

so it is clear that there is an interference or beat note term in a square-law detector

$$|E^{(+)}|^2=|\mathcal{E}_1|^2+|\mathcal{E}_2|^2+\lbrace\mathcal{E}_1^*\mathcal{E}_2exp\lbrack i(\nu_1-\nu_2)t\rbrack+c.c.\rbrace$$.

== Calculation based on quantum electrodynamics ==
For quantum electrodynamical calculation, we should introduce the creation and annihilation operators from second quantization of quantum mechanics.

Let

$E_n^{(+)}=a_nexp(-i\nu_nt)$ is an annihilation operator and
$E_n^{(-)}=a_n^\dagger exp(i\nu_nt)$ is a creation operator.

Then the beat note becomes

$\langle\psi_V(t)|E_1^{(-)}(t)E_2^{(+)}(t)|\psi_V(t)\rangle$ for V-type and
$\langle\psi_\Lambda(t)|E_1^{(-)}(t)E_2^{(+)}(t)|\psi_\Lambda(t)\rangle$ for $\Lambda$-type,

when the state vector for each type is

$|\psi_V(t)\rangle=\sum_{i=a,b, c}c_i|i,0\rangle+c_1|c,1_{\nu_1}\rangle+c_2|c,1_{\nu_2}\rangle$ and
$$|\psi_\Lambda(t)\rangle=\sum_{i=a,b, c}c_i'|i,0\rangle+c_1'|b,1_{\nu_1}\rangle+c_2'|c,1_{\nu_2}\rangle$$.

The beat note term becomes

$\langle\psi_V(t)|E_1^{(-)}(t)E_2^{(+)}(t)|\psi_V(t)\rangle=\kappa\langle 1_{\nu_1}0_{\nu_2}|a_1^\dagger a_2|0_{\nu_1}1_{\nu_2}\rangle exp\lbrack i(\nu_1-\nu_2)t\rbrack\langle c|c\rangle=\kappa exp\lbrack i(\nu_1-\nu_2)t\rbrack\langle c|c\rangle$ for V-type and
$\langle\psi_\Lambda(t)|E_1^{(-)}(t)E_2^{(+)}(t)|\psi_\Lambda(t)\rangle=\kappa'\langle 1_{\nu_1}0_{\nu_2}|a_1^\dagger a_2|0_{\nu_1}1_{\nu_2}\rangle exp\lbrack i(\nu_1-\nu_2)t\rbrack\langle b|c\rangle=\kappa' exp\lbrack i(\nu_1-\nu_2)t\rbrack\langle b|c\rangle$ for $\Lambda$-type.

By orthogonality of eigenstates, however $\langle c|c\rangle=1$ and $\langle b|c\rangle=0$.

Therefore, there is a beat note term for V-type atoms, but not for $\Lambda$-type atoms.

== Conclusion ==
As a result of calculation, V-type atoms have quantum beats but $\Lambda$-type atoms do not. This difference is caused by quantum mechanical uncertainty. A V-type atom decays to state $|c\rangle$ via the emission with $\nu_1$ and $\nu_2$. Since both transitions decayed to the same state, one cannot determine along which path each decayed, similar to Young's double-slit experiment. However, $\Lambda$-type atoms decay to two different states. Therefore, in this case we can recognize the path, even if it decays via two emissions as does V-type. Simply, we already know the path of the emission and decay.

The calculation by QED is correct in accordance with the most fundamental principle of quantum mechanics, the uncertainty principle. Quantum beats phenomena are good examples of such that can be described by QED but not by SCT.

== See also ==
- Quantum electrodynamics
- Double-slit experiment
- Quantum beats in semiconductor optics
