= Mental health in India =

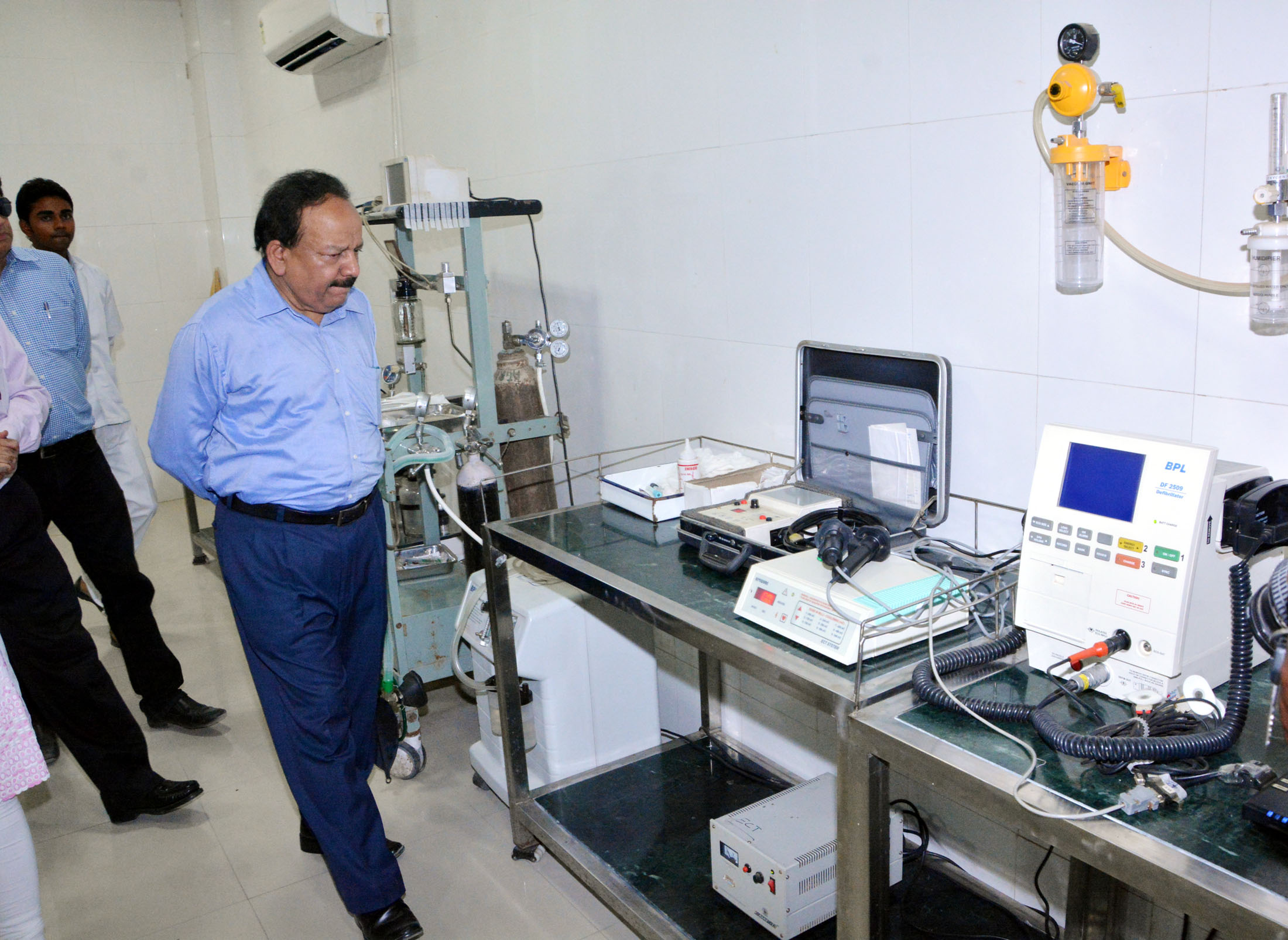
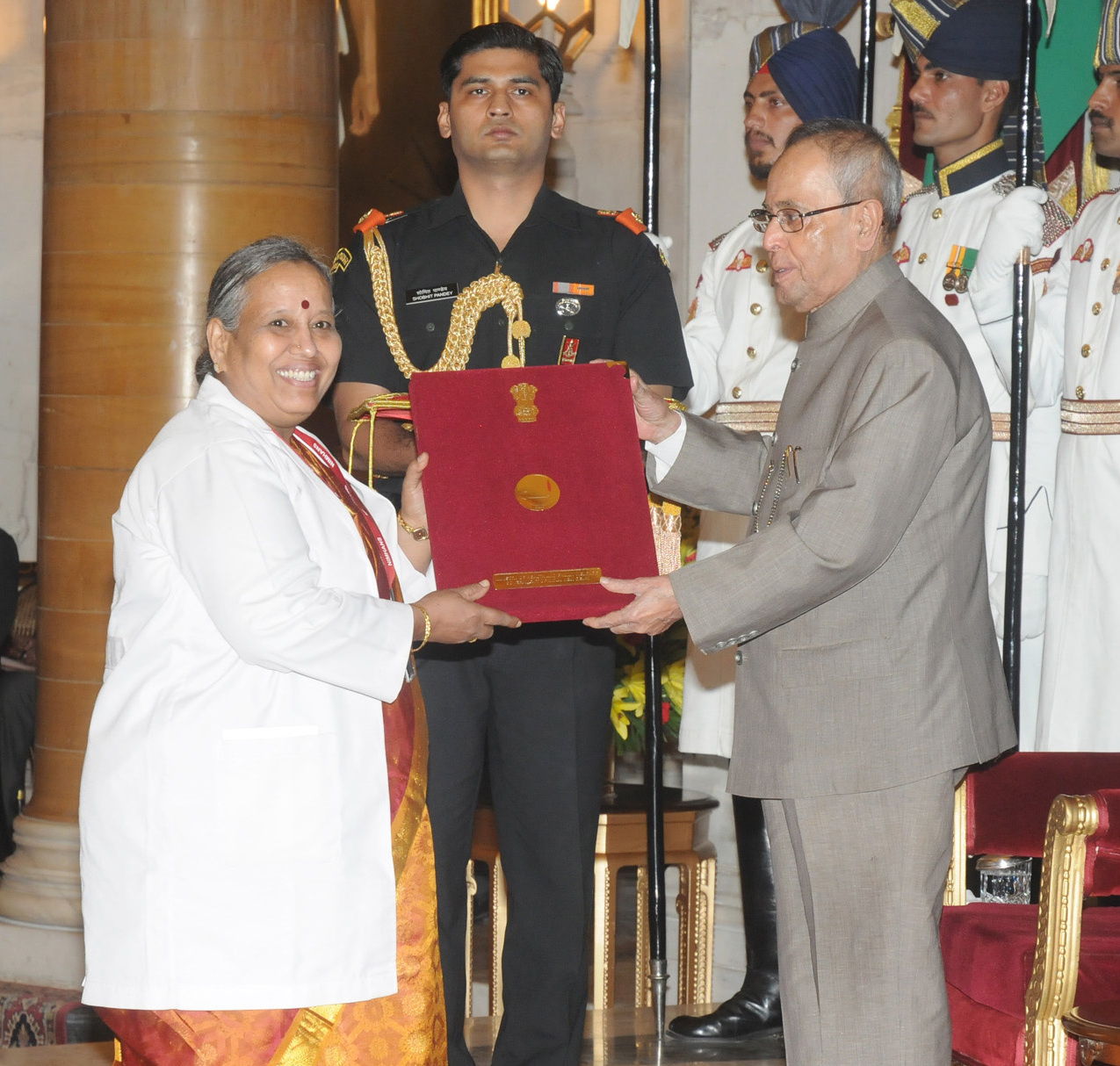
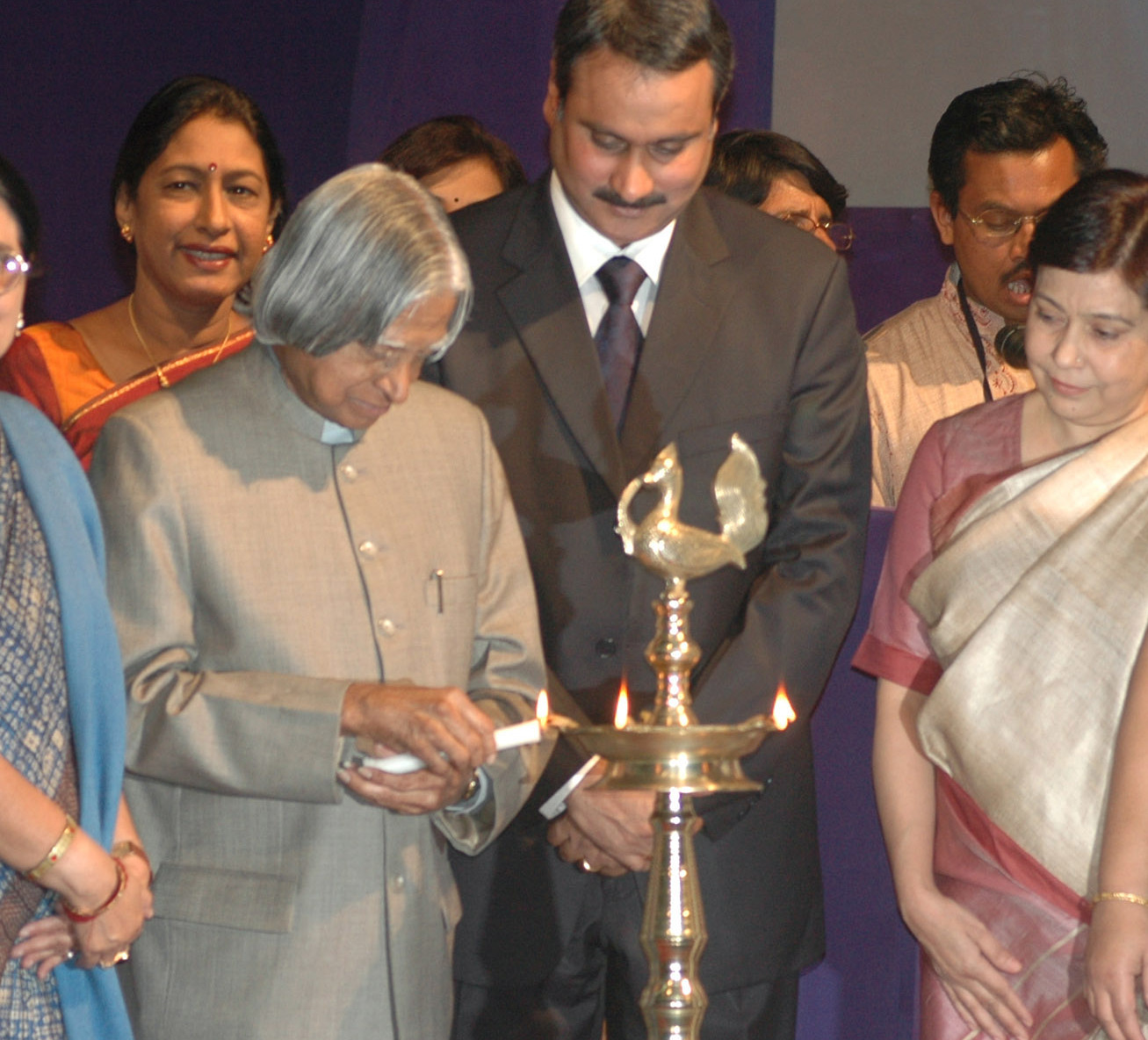
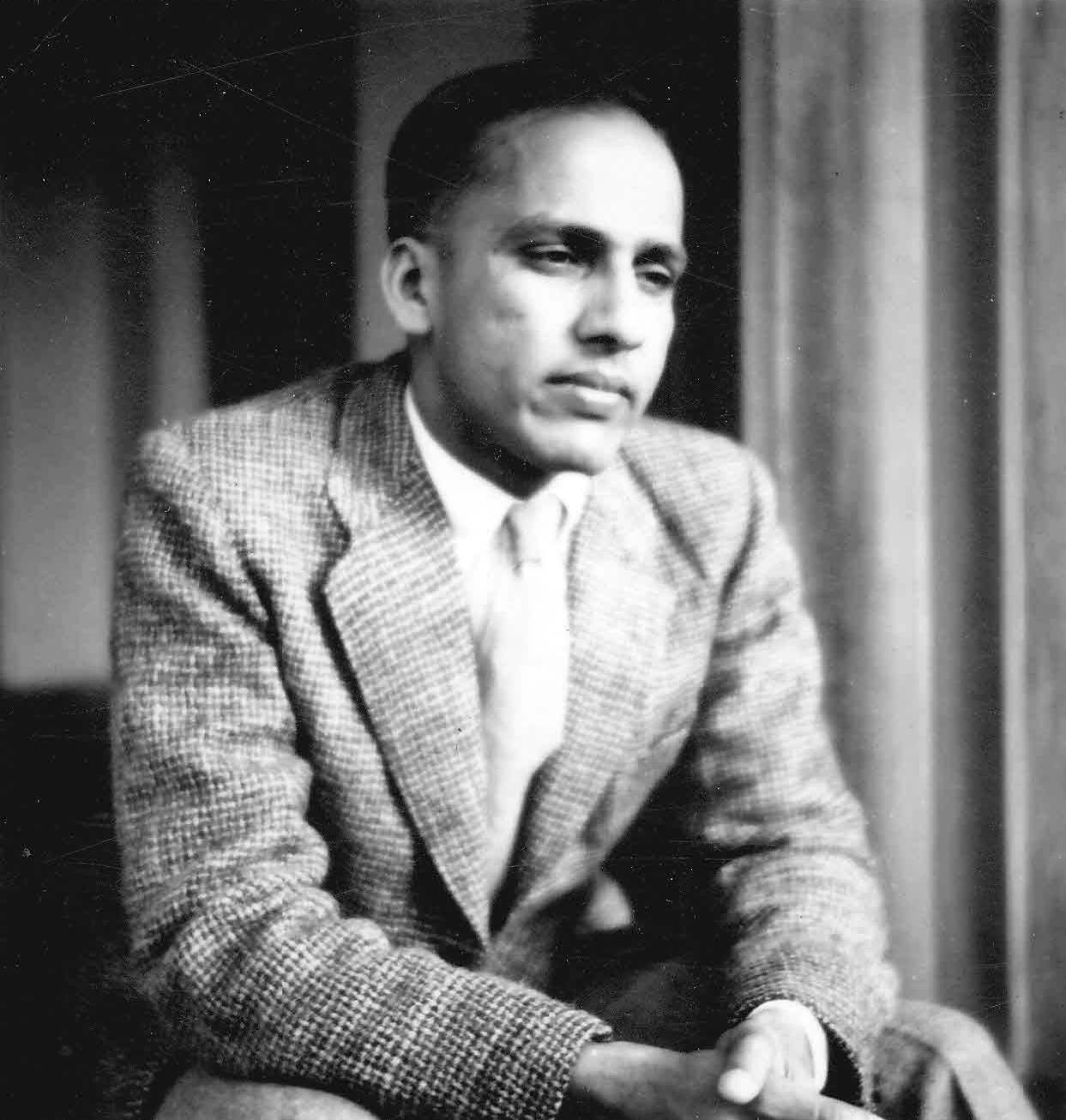
- Top left: The Union Health Minister Harsh Vardhan inspecting equipment used in treatment of mentally ill patients at National JALMA Institute in 2014.
- Top right: President Mukherjee awarding Chief Nursing Officer, NIMHANS. India has only 0.8 mental health nurses per 100000 people.
- Bottom left: President Kalam inaugurating a national seminar on the theme "Mentally Ill Women – is Destitution the only Answer?" in 2007.
- Bottom right: Indian Clinical Psychologist H. Narayan Murthy; former head of the department of Clinical psychology, NIMHANS

Mental healthcare in India is a right secured to every person in the country by law. Indian mental health legislation, as per a 2017 study, meets 68% (119/175) of the World Health Organization (WHO) standards laid down in the WHO Checklist of Mental Health Legislation. However, human resources and expertise in the field of mental health in India is significantly low when compared to the population of the country. The allocation of the national healthcare budget to mental health is also low, standing at 0.16%. India's mental health policy was released in 2014.

The first Western-style mental healthcare institutions date back to the factories of the East India Company in the 17th century. Mental healthcare in colonial India and the years post-independence was custodial and segregationist. It slowly moved towards a more curative and therapeutic nature by the end of the 20th century. Public interest litigations and judicial intervention, followed by reviews and monitoring of the National Human Rights Commission and National Institute of Mental Health and Neurosciences, coupled with an expansion of facilities for developing human resources in the field of mental healthcare, among other changes, has all positively contributed to the state of mental health and healthcare in the country.

== History ==
Modern psychiatry in the Indian subcontinent dates back to the factories of the East India Company in the 17th century. The first asylum was established in Bombay in 1745 and the second at Calcutta in 1784, both only for Europeans. Dr LP Varma, First Assistant Superintendent, Indian Mental Hospital, Ranchi observed in 1953, "The history of Psychiatry in this country is the history of establishment of mental hospitals and then increasing its accommodation from time to time as the exigencies of the time demand".

=== Moore Taylor's survey and Bhore Committee Report 1946 ===
The Bhore Committee found that the position of mental health and mental healthcare in India was "extremely unsatisfactory". Colonel Moore Taylor, I.M.S., Medical Superintendent, Ranchi European Mental Hospital, reviewed all the major mental health hospitals in the country, the findings of which were presented in the Bhore Committee Report. Colonel Taylor noted that "Every mental hospital which I have visited is disgracefully under-staffed" as well as run by unqualified staff, lacking experience and training. However in certain cases such as the Child Guidance Clinic of the Sir Dorabji Tata Institute of Social Sciences, Col Taylor commented that he was "greatly impressed by the work".

=== PILs and judicial intervention ===
1980s onwards, public interest litigations (PILs) in India have been successful in bringing forward "horror tales of insane prisoners", "mental hospital (used as) dumping ground(s) for (the) unwanted" and the "callous conditions (that) plague (the) dustbins of society". PILs have resulted in courts to investigate the dismal workings of mental institutions such as the government run Shahdara Mental Hospital (BR Kapoor vs. Union of India 1983 and People's Union for Civil Liberties vs. Union of India 1983) and Trivandrum Mental Home resulting in substantial improvements. One of the first cases in this regard was Upendra Baxi vs. State of UP in 1983 concerning the human rights of the inmates of a Protective Home (Note: The protective home was "established under the provisions of the Suppression of Immoral Traffic in Women and Girls Act 1956") at Agra. PILs subsequently raised issues concerning mentally ill prisoners (Veena Sethi vs. State of Bihar 1982) and the detention of those with intellectual disability (Sheila Barse and others vs. Union of India and Ors 1986).

In 1988, in the case of Rakesh Chandra Narayan v. State of Bihar, the petitioners wrote a letter to the Supreme Court in 1985 regarding the dismal working of a mental hospital in Ranchi, Bihar. Following a court initiated review of the mental hospital by the Chief Judicial Magistrate as well as a later review by the Union Health Secretary, M.S. Dayal, the court held that the mental hospital resembled a "medieval torture house" and that a complete renovation was needed. The services of a psychiatrist were acknowledged by the Supreme Court. This kind of judicial intervention has resulted in changes in the conditions of mental hospitals which have been brought before the court. Further, the Supreme Court decided to "keep the case(s) alive on its files so that the improvements which have emanated due to interest and supervision of the court are not wiped out once it withdraws its scrutiny". However, while the courts gave direction to improve mental hospitals, it did not pronounce judgement on the laws that were in contradiction to the efforts of the courts, such as the Lunacy Act 1912. In November 1997, in response to the PILs the Supreme Court directed the National Human Rights Commission (NHRC) to monitor specific mental hospitals across the country.

=== NHRC review in 1999, 2008 and 2013 ===
Apart from the supervision of three mental hospitals across the country the NHRC supported an initiative on "Quality Assurance in Mental Health" undertaken by the National Institute of Mental Health and Neurosciences (NIMHANS) between 1997 and 1999. This landmark report involved "37 government psychiatric institutions, 7 private psychiatric institutions, and 23 general psychiatric units" across the country. The report revealed glaring deficiencies and violations. 7 hospitals were rated very poor, 8 poor, 11 average and 6 good. The hospitals in the good category had adequate basic living conditions, but were nevertheless lacking in terms of service quality. "Overall, mental health care in the mental hospitals was custodial rather than therapeutic". Pratima Murthy from NIMHANS writes that the report was a landmark in "highlighting the state of mental health services in India. However, the report, like many others before it may have disappeared into oblivion, had it not been for the Erwadi tragedy".

In 2008 a follow-up review was conducted of government run hospitals. Overall, the report found that immense changes had been made in the last decade. Positive changes included improved infrastructure, improvements in diet, greater integration of community activities and improved budgetary allocations. The positive changes were attributed to separate budgets for hospitals, monitoring by agencies such as NHRC, involvement of the leadership and raising awareness of the families related to patient care. Poor progress had been made in the area of human resources including lack of adequately qualified staff and lack of post graduate training. This poor progress was attributed to various reasons such as social isolation of the institutions, large bed strengths and lack of state government involvement in areas such as release of funds and supporting change. In 2013, the court formed another team to review the overall situation of mental healthcare in the country. Observations from this included lack of information related to mental health and mental healthcare in many regions of the country, a bed ratio well below the global ratio and that there are more than 325 NGOs in the mental healthcare among other things.

=== National Mental Health Programme ===
The National Mental Health Programme (NMHP) was initiated in 1982, aimed at developing community based mental health services. NMHP was operationalised in 1996 as the District Mental Health Program (DMHP) based on a pilot programme, later known as the 'Bellary Model', that had been conducted in 1980 in the district of Bellary, Karnataka. Since its inception, the scope of the NMHP has increased, visible in the increase in its budgetary from ₹28 crore (equivalent to ₹156 crore or US$16 million in 2026) during the 9th Five-Year Plan (1997–2002) to ₹1,000 crore (equivalent to ₹33 billion or US$340 million in 2026) during the 11th Five Year Plan (2007–2012). The aim was that DMHP would cover all the districts by 2025. By 2015, DMHP was present in 27% of the districts.

An objective of the NMHP is to integrate knowledge of mental healthcare with general healthcare. At the first Global Ministerial Conference on Healthy Lifestyles and Noncommunicable Diseases, organised by the WHO and the Government of Russia in 2011 and attended by 162 countries, following India's insistence, mental health was included in the list of noncommunicable diseases.

=== Timeline ===
- Indian Lunatic Asylum Act 1858
- Lunacy Act 1912
- Mapother report 1938
- Moore Taylor's survey and Bhore Committee report 1946
- Mudaliar Committee report, 1961
- Mental Health Act 1987
- National Mental Health Programme (NMHP) in 1982
- Mental Health Rules 1990
- Medical superintendents workshops at Agra (1960), Ranchi (1986), Bangalore (1988) and New Delhi (1990)
- District Mental Health Program (DMHP) under NMHP in 1996
- NIMHANS/NHRC review 1997 to 1999
- Erwadi fire incident 2001 and following DGHS report
- NIMHANS/NHRC review 2008
- Mental Health Care Bill 2013
- National Mental Health Policy 2014
- Disabilities Act, 2016
- Mental Healthcare Act, 2017
- Tele MANAS (Tele Mental Health Assistance And Networking Across States) 2022

== Legislation ==
=== Lunacy legislation ===
Lunacy legislation in British India included the Lunatic Removal Act 1851, the Indian Lunatic Asylum Act 1858, the Military Lunatic Act 1877, and a bunch of others related to lunacy along with their amendments. The first law to govern mental health in India was the Indian Lunacy Act 1912, which itself drew heavily from the English Lunatics Act 1845. The Indian Psychiatric Society suggested a draft in 1950, however it was only given assent by the President in May 1987, and implemented in 1993 as the Mental Health Act 1987. Criticism of the Mental Health Act 1987 led to the Mental Health Care Bill 2013, which was finally passed as the Mental Healthcare Act, 2017.

=== Right to mental healthcare ===
India made efforts to align its disability and mental health laws with the UN Convention on the Rights of Persons with Disabilities, visible in the passage of the Rights of Persons with Disabilities Act, 2016 and the Mental Healthcare Act, 2017. The Mental Healthcare Act states the rights of persons with mental illness, including the right to mental healthcare. Section 18 states that "Every person shall have a right to access mental healthcare and treatment from mental health services run or funded by the appropriate Government" and that "the right to access mental healthcare and treatment shall mean mental health services of affordable cost, of good quality, available in sufficient quantity, accessible geographically, without discrimination on the basis of gender, sex, sexual orientation, religion, culture, caste, social or political beliefs, class, disability or any other basis and provided in a manner that is acceptable to persons with mental illness and their families and care-givers."

The Mental Healthcare Act addresses 96/175 (55.4%) of the WHO Checklist of Mental Health Legislation, the concordance increases to 68% when other relevant laws are considered. Low concordance areas include the rights of careers, competence and involuntary community treatment.

=== Insurance to mental healthcare ===
Section 21(4)A of the Mental Healthcare Act, 2017, provides that there should be no discrimination between mental illnesses and physical illness, and that every insurer shall make provision for medical insurance for treatment of mental illness on the same basis as is available for treatment of physical illness. However, the majority of insurance companies exclude large number of mental conditions from full coverage of the policy.

== Mental health workforce ==
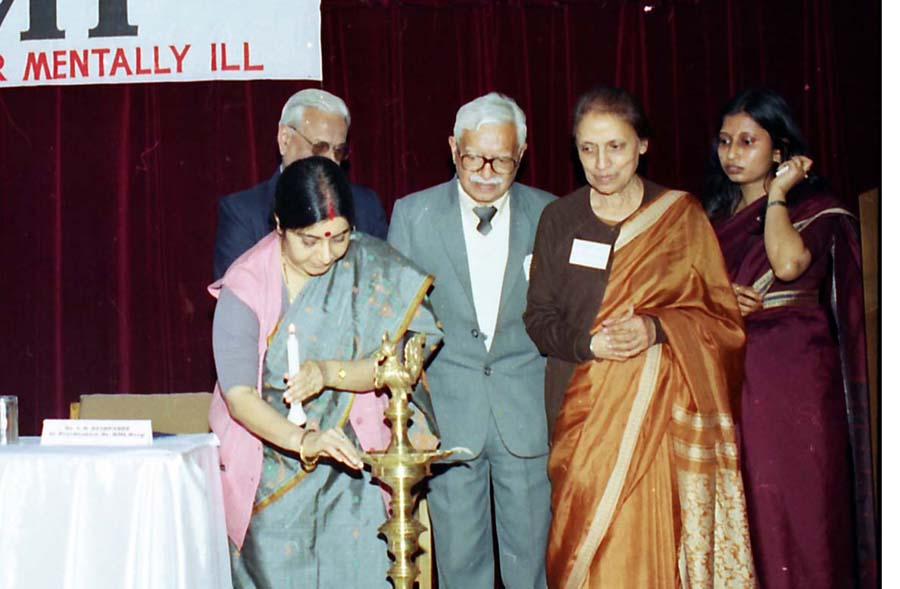
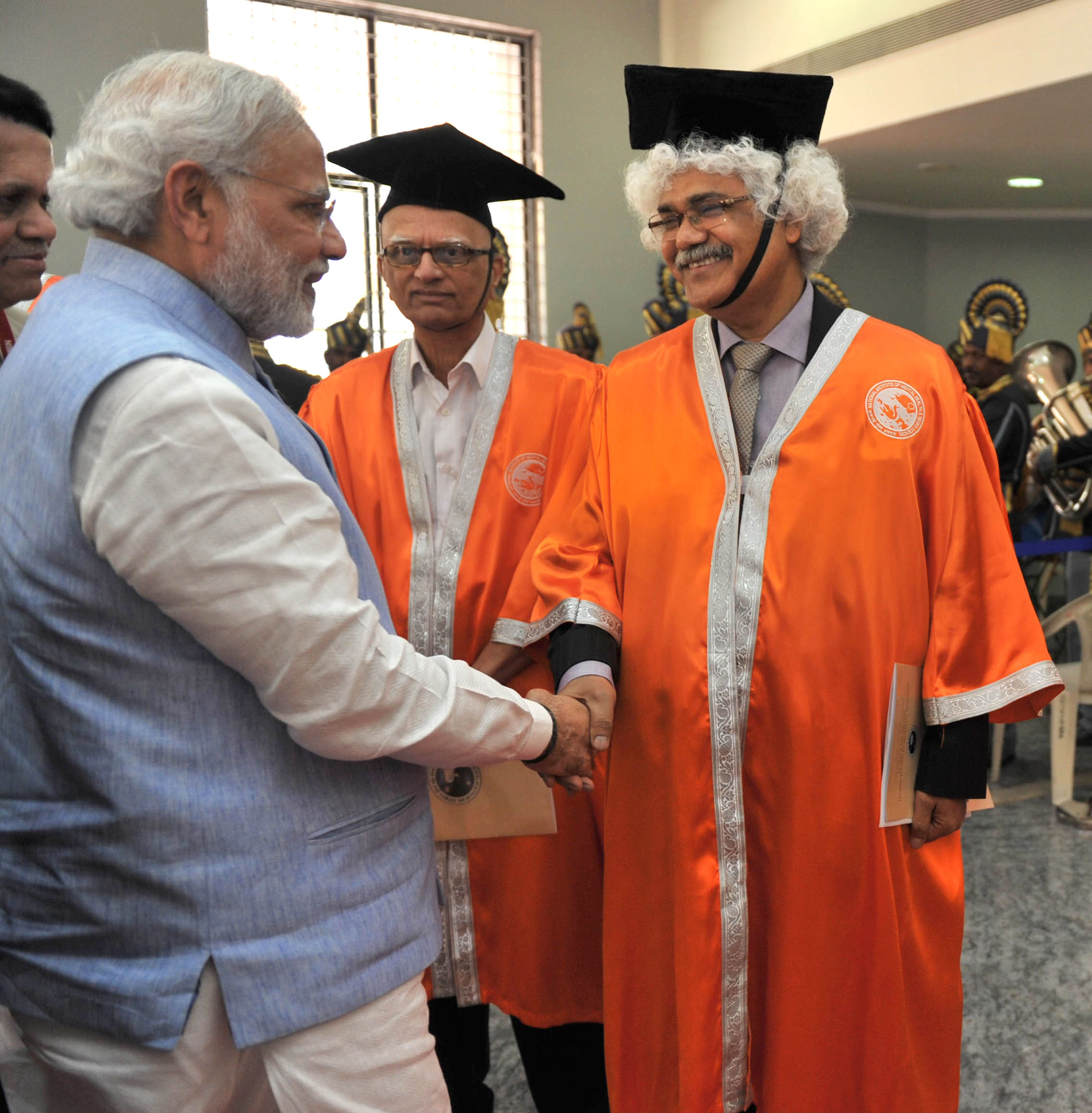
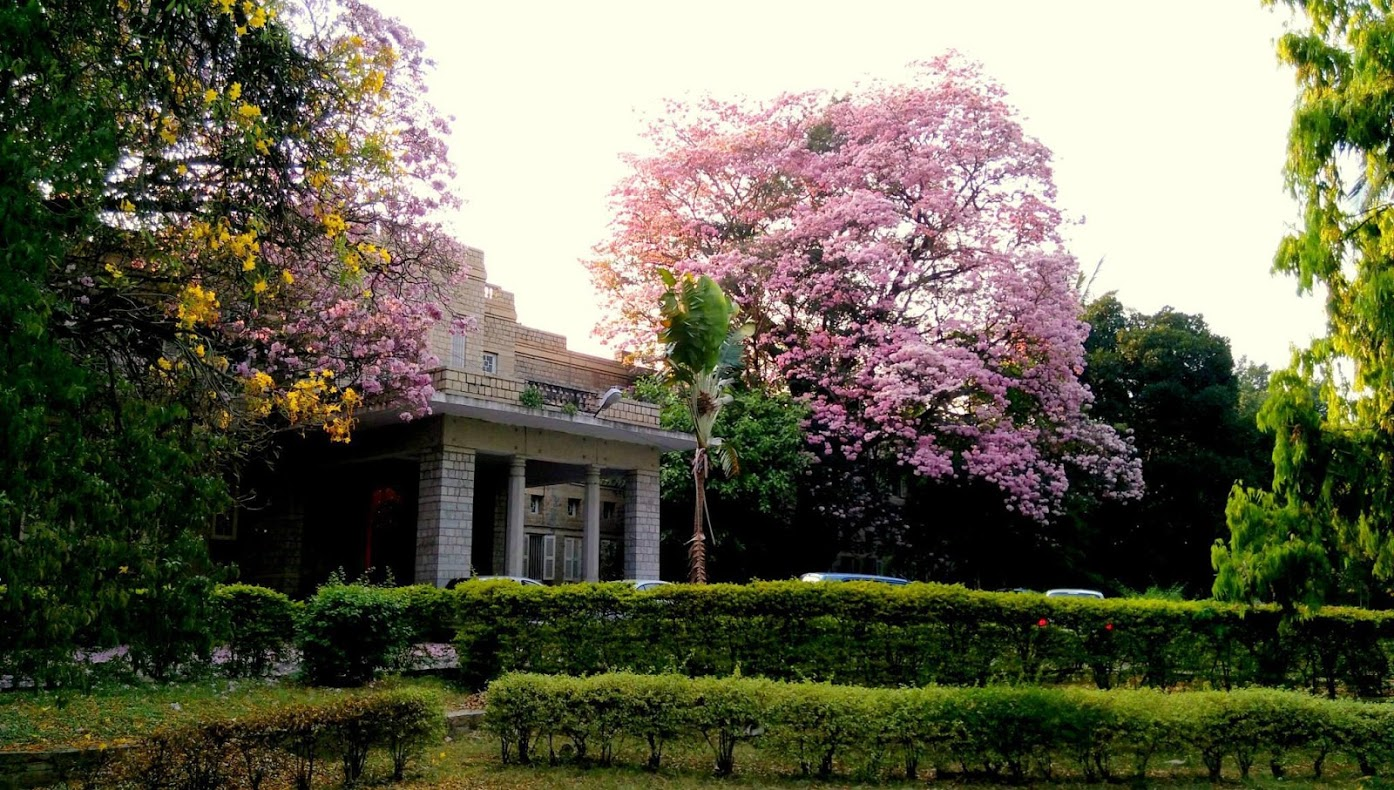
- Top left: The Union Health Minister Sushma Swaraj inaugurates the Conference of the National Federation for Mentally ill in 2004.
- Top right: Prime Minister Modi being welcomed on his arrival at the 19th convocation ceremony of NIMHANS in 2015.
- Bottom left: Department of Psychiatry campus, NIMHANS.

Per 100,000 population, India has 0.3 psychiatrists, 0.12 nurses, 0.07 psychologists and 0.07 social workers. As of 2019, there are "0.3 psychiatrists per 100000 people in India compared to 2.2 in China and 10.5 in the United States" and "0.8 mental health nurses per 100000 people in India compared to 5.4 in China and 4.3 in US".

In 2007, the Indian Psychiatric Society had 3000 registered psychiatrists on its rolls. In 2020, the society had over 7200 specialists enlisted. Mental health professionals such as psychiatrists acquire their qualification following completing an MD in Psychiatry, a Diploma in Psychiatric Medicine (DPM) or Diplomate of National Board (DNB) in Psychiatry; following an MBBS from a Medical Council of India center. MCI recognition is a statutory requirement. Combining these three methods of obtaining the required qualification, as of 2008, 250 psychiatrists are generated each year.

=== Mental hospitals in India ===
47 mental hospitals in the country account for a large proportion (18,307) of the total mental health beds available in the country. Mental hospitals in India include:

- Lokopriya Gopinath Bordoloi Regional Institute of Mental Health (LGBRIMH) Tezpur, 1876
- Central Institute of Psychiatry (CIP) Ranchi, 1918
- Ranchi Institute of Neuropsychiatry and Allied Sciences (RINPAS) Ranchi, 1925
- Institute of Psychiatry (IOP) Goa, 1957
- Psychiatric Diseases Hospital (PDH) Jammu, 1964
- Institute of Human Behaviour and Allied Sciences (IHBAS) Delhi, 1966
- National Institute of Mental Health and Neurosciences (NIMHANS) Bangalore, 1925

== Mental Health Campaign In India ==
The Ministry of Health and Family Welfare conducts mental health campaign every year for a few days. The Live Love Laugh Foundation started DobaraPoocho Campaign. Psychologs magazine started India's largest mental health campaign, "Utsaah" where more than one lakh people participate yearly.

== Prevalence ==
The National Mental Health Survey of India in 2016 found that "1 in 20 people in India suffer from depression", "productive age groups are affected most", "economic burden of mental disorders is huge" and that the treatment gap varies between 70% and 92%. Two different meta-analysis in 1998 and 2000 reported a psychiatric morbidity of 58.2 and 73 per 1000 general population respectively. The burden of mental health problems in India is estimated to be 2,443 DALYs (disability-adjusted life years) per 100,000 population. According to a study published in Lancet in 2019, "One in seven Indians were affected by mental disorders of varying severity in 2017 [...] Substantial variations exist between states in the burden from different mental disorders and in their trends over time."

India reported that a total of 296,438 Indian farmers committing suicide between 1995 and 2015. The Indian Armed Forces lose 100 soldiers every year due to suicides and fratricides. In 2020 more business people committed suicide than farmers.

== Awareness and portrayal ==
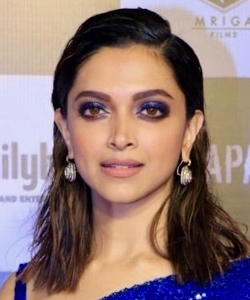
Deepika Padukone (pictured in 2020) is the brand ambassador for the Indian Psychiatric Society and an advocate of mental healthcare. The World Economic Forum presented her with the Crystal Award in 2020 for creating awareness on mental health. Padukone has publicly spoken about her personal experience of overcoming depression.

In the run up to the 2019 Indian general election, the Indian Psychiatry Society asked politicians not to use the word 'mental' or similar terms such as "mental instability", "mad" or "send them to a mental hospital" when talking about their opponents, and informed the Election Commission of India of the same.

Mental illness is portrayed in most of Indian cinema with excessive dramatization, minimal sensitivity or scientific credibility, to the extent that psychiatric treatments become tools of punishment and causes of insanity— Funtoosh, Pagla Kahin Ka, Sholay, Khal Nayak, Baazigar, Kaun?, Anjaana Anjaani and No Entry. On the other hand, films such as Tamasha and Taare Zameen Par stand out in this context. The portrayal of depression is also lacking of scientific temper. Developing scientific temper among the citizens is a fundamental duty prescribed in Article 51A(h) of the Indian Constitution.

During a study conducted in 2022 in India, it was observed that around 32% of the patients initially sought assistance from general medical practitioners, followed by consultations with psychiatrists and faith healers. The study also revealed an average delay of 24 months before patients accessed psychiatric services.

== See also ==
Professional Associations

- Indian Psychiatric Society
- Indian Association of Private Psychiatry
- Indian Association of Clinical Psychology
- National Academy of Psychology

Mental Health Journals/Magazine

- Indian Journal of Psychiatry
- Indian Journal of Psychological Medicine
- Journal of Indian Association for Child and Adolescent Mental Health
- Mens Sana Monographs
- Psychologs

Indices

- World Happiness Report
- List of countries by suicide rate
- Satisfaction with Life Index

Other

- Global mental health
- UN Convention on the Rights of Persons with Disabilities
- International Classification of Diseases (ICD-10)
- Chinese Classification of Mental Disorders
- Indian psychology
- N. N. Wig
