= The Occupied Clinic =

2020 non-fiction book by Saiba Varma

The Occupied Clinic: Militarism and Care in Kashmir
- Author: Saiba Varma
- Language: English
- Publisher: Duke University Press
- Publication date: October 2020
- Publication place: United States
- Media type: Print, e-book
- Pages: 304
- ISBN: 978-1-4780-1098-2

The Occupied Clinic: Militarism and Care in Kashmir is a monograph by Saiba Varma, in the field of medical anthropology. It was published in October 2020 by Duke University Press (as well as Yoda Press). Varma is an Associate Professor of Medical Anthropology at University of California, San Diego. She is also the incumbent Vice Chair of Undergraduate Studies.

== Content ==
Varma's scholarship discusses the broad effects of chronic unresolved conflict in Indian-administered Jammu and Kashmir on the mental health of local population. She probes into how local psychiatric clinics tackle these issues but in the process, become microcosms of the broader political fractures governing Kashmir.

== Reception ==
The book went on to receive the Edie Turner First Book Prize in Ethnographic Writing by the American Anthropological Association.

Varma has been accused of not being transparent about her positionality — she did not disclose that her father was a top brass of India's security apparatus.

== See also ==
- Kashmir conflict
- Insurgency in Jammu and Kashmir
- Mental health in India
