= Kanke (disambiguation) =

Kanke is a place in Ranchi District, Jharkhand, India.

Kanke may also refer to:

- Kanke (Vidhan Sabha constituency), an assembly constituency in Jharkhand, India
- Kanke block, an administrative block of Ranchi District, Jharkhand, India
- Kanke, Nigeria, a Local Government Area in Plateau State, Nigeria
- Kanke Rōka, the Sugawara Family Hall run by Sugawara no Michizane
