= Ganesan Venkatasubramanian =

Indian psychiatrist and clinician

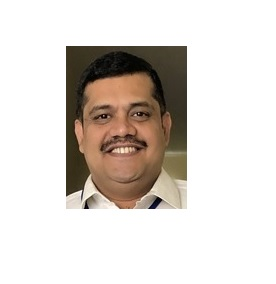
- Ganesan Venkatasubramanian
- Born: Tamil Nadu, India
- Education: Stanley Medical College; NIMHANS; University of Sheffield
- Known for: Studies in schizophrenia and tDCS
- Awards: 2023 Fellow - Indian Academy of Sciences (FASc); 2022 Fellow - Indian National Science Academy (FNA); 2021 Fellow - National Academy of Medical Sciences (FAMS); 2020 Fellow - National Academy of Sciences, India (FNASc); 2019 N-Bios Prize; 2018 Shanti Swarup Bhatnagar Prize; 2016 Swarnajayanti Fellowship; 2013 ICMR Dr. Vidyasagar Award; 2011 DBT Senior Innovative Young Biotechnologist Award; 2009 INSA Young Scientist Medal; 2009 ICMR Shakuntala Amir Chand Prize; 2009 IPS Young Psychiatrist Award; 2008 NASI Platinum Jubilee Young Sscientist Award; 2006 Elsevier Scopus Young Scientist Award
- Scientific career
- Fields: Psychiatry
- Workplaces: NIMHANS (Professor) Centre for Brain Research (Adjunct Faculty) NIMHANS-IOB Laboratory (Collaborating Scientist)
- Doctoral advisor: B. N. Gangadhar; R. Raguram; M. S. Keshavan; Sean Spence

Ganesan Venkatasubramanian is an Indian psychiatrist and clinician-scientist who works as a professor of psychiatry at the National Institute of Mental Health and Neurosciences, Bangalore (NIMHANS). My overarching research interest is to learn the science that will facilitate a personalized approach to understanding disorders like Schizophrenia, Bipolar Disorder and treating them using state-of-the-art psychopharmacology as well as advanced neuromodulatory interventions like transcranial Electrical Stimulation & other interventions anchored on translational neurobiology. Venkatasubramanian is known for his studies in the fields of schizophrenia, transcranial Direct Current Stimulation (tDCS), brain imaging, neuroimmunology, neurometabolism and several other areas of biological psychiatry. The Council of Scientific and Industrial Research, the apex agency of the Government of India for scientific research, awarded him the Shanti Swarup Bhatnagar Prize for Science and Technology, one of the highest Indian science awards, for his contributions to medical sciences in 2018. (Note: Long link - please select award year to see details) Besides, he is an adjunct faculty at the Centre for Brain Research (CBR) in Bangalore. Furthermore, he is a distinguished visiting professor at the Department of Cognitive Science, Indian Institute of Technology (IIT), Kanpur.

== Biography ==
Ganesan Venkatasubramanian, born in the south Indian state of Tamil Nadu, graduated in medicine in 1998 from Stanley Medical College, completed his MD in Psychiatry in 2001 and PhD in Psychiatry (Schizophrenia) in 2013 from the National Institute of Mental Health and Neurosciences (NIMHANS). He did his clinical research studies under Professor B. N. Gangadhar and Professor M. S. Keshavan at NIMHANS. Later, he worked in University of Sheffield at the SCANLab as a clinical research fellow for training in advanced brain imaging techniques under Sean Spence, who pioneered the brain scan lie detector. On his return to India in 2004, he joined NIMHANS as an assistant professor of psychiatry and holds the position of professor of psychiatry since 2016. At NIMHANS, he heads the Translational Psychiatry Laboratory (TransPsych Lab) as its principal investigator and hosts a number of researchers. He also serves as a consultant at the Schizophrenia Clinic and the Metabolic Clinic in Psychiatry of the institution.

== Research and contributions ==
Venkatasubramanian's research focus is in the fields of Schizophrenia, transcranial Direct Current Stimulation (tDCS), Brain imaging, Neuroimmunology, Neurometabolism, Clinical cognitive neuroscience and Psychopharmacology. He is known to have done extensive studies on evolutionary biology of human brain with respect to psychiatric disorders and exceptional skills and has published a number of articles, (Note: Please see Selected bibliography section) ResearchGate, an online repository of scientific articles has listed 371 of them. He is the Neuromodulation section editor of the Indian Journal of Psychological Medicine and serves as the associate editor of Asian Journal of Psychiatry published by Elsevier. He is also a member of the Indian Psychiatric Society and co-chaired its Biological Psychiatry section during 2010–11.

== Awards and honors ==
During his student days at Stanley Medical College (Chennai), Venkatasubramanian received several academic honors including Sankunni Marar Memorial Gold Medal in Physiology (1993), Maharaja of Cochin Prize in Physiology (1993), Kannusamy Memorial Prize in Pharmacology (1994), Professor Dr. Lalitha Kameswaran Prize for Pharmacology of The Tamil Nadu Dr. MGR Medical University (1994), Dr. S. S. Jain Memorial Gold Medal in Otorhinolaryngology (1995), Madras University Students' Club Endowment Prize in Forensic Medicine (1995), Dr. K. C. Paul's Prize in Clinical Surgery (1996) and Dr. K.C. Paul's Prize in Clinical Medicine (1996). He received the Silver Jubilee Award for the Best Outgoing Resident Doctor of MD in Psychiatry at NIMHANS for the year 2001. The research paper awards received by him include Best Postgraduate Research Paper Award of Indian Psychiatric Society conference – Karnataka (2000), Dr. D. S. Raju Award of the Indian Psychiatric Society conference in Madurai (2000), Best Original Research Paper Award of the German Journal of Psychiatry (2002), Dr. S. S. Jayaram Award Indian Psychiatric Society, South Zone conference (2002), Bombay Psychiatric Society Silver Jubilee Award of the Indian Psychiatric Society – Hyderabad conference (2003), Bhagwat Award of the Indian Psychiatric Society conference (2007), Marfatia Award of the Indian Psychiatric Society - Kolkata conference (2008), Poona Psychiatrists Association Award 2009 and Poona Psychiatrists Association Award 2011.

Venkatasubramanian received the Young Scientist Award at the 12th Biennial International Winter Workshop on Schizophrenia in Davos, Switzerland in 2004 and the Scopus Young Scientist Award for Medicine of Elsevier in 2006. The National Academy of Sciences, India awarded him the Platinum Jubilee Young Scientist Award and he received the Innovative Young Biotechnologist Award of the Department of Biotechnology, both in 2008. The year 2009 brought him three awards, the Young Psychiatrist Award of the Indian Psychiatric Society, Shakuntala Amir Chand Prize of the ICMR and the Young Scientist Medal of the Indian National Science Academy, He is a co-recipient of the Aristotle Award in 2010 and Dr. Vidyasagar Award of the Indian Council of Medical Research in 2013. He is a recipient of the Senior Fellowship of Wellcome Trust and DBT India Alliance. He was awarded the SwarnaJayanti Fellowship in the field of life science (2014–15) by the Department of Science and Technology. The Council of Scientific and Industrial Research awarded him the Shanti Swarup Bhatnagar Prize, one of the highest Indian science awards in 2018. He has also received the Tilak Venkoba Rao Oration Award by the Indian Psychiatric Society (2006), Professor M. Vaidyalingam Memorial Oration Award (2012) and the Best Poster Award at Neurobionics 2013 (Indo-German Workshop on Clinical Neurology).

== Selected bibliography ==
- Venkatasubramanian G, Narayanaswamy JC (January 2019). "Transcranial direct current stimulation in psychiatry". The Lancet. Psychiatry. 6 (1): 8–9. doi:10.1016/S2215-0366(18)30468-1. PMID 30579497. S2CID 58606074.
- Kalmady SV, Greiner R, Agrawal R, Shivakumar V, Narayanaswamy JC, Brown MR, Greenshaw AJ, Dursun SM, Venkatasubramanian G (January 2019). "Towards artificial intelligence in mental health by improving schizophrenia prediction with multiple brain parcellation ensemble-learning". npj Schizophrenia. 5 (1): 2. doi:10.1038/s41537-018-0070-8. PMC 6386753. PMID 30659193.
- Bose A, Shivakumar V, Agarwal SM, Kalmady SV, Shenoy S, Sreeraj VS, Narayanaswamy JC, Venkatasubramanian G (May 2018). "Efficacy of fronto-temporal transcranial direct current stimulation for refractory auditory verbal hallucinations in schizophrenia: A randomized, double-blind, sham-controlled study". Schizophrenia Research. 195: 475–80. doi:10.1016/j.schres.2017.08.047. PMID 28866447. S2CID 12421425.
- Kalmady SV, Venkatasubramanian G, Shivakumar V, Gautham S, Subramaniam A, Jose DA, Maitra A, Ravi V, Gangadhar BN (May 2014). "Relationship between Interleukin-6 gene polymorphism and hippocampal volume in antipsychotic-naïve schizophrenia: evidence for differential susceptibility?". PLOS ONE. 9 (5) e96021. Bibcode:2014PLoSO...996021K. doi:10.1371/journal.pone.0096021. PMC 4008499. PMID 24787542.
- Kalmady SV, Venkatasubramanian G (March 2009). "Evidence for positive selection on Protocadherin Y gene in Homo sapiens: implications for schizophrenia". Schizophrenia Research. 108 (1–3): 299–300. doi:10.1016/j.schres.2008.09.015. PMID 18938061. S2CID 26590444.
- Venkatasubramanian G (October 2007). "Schizophrenia is a disorder of aberrant neurodevelopment: A synthesis of evidence from clinical and structural, functional and neurochemical brain imaging studies". Indian Journal of Psychiatry. 49 (4): 244–9. doi:10.4103/0019-5545.37663. PMC 2910346. PMID 20680135.
- Venkatasubramanian G, Chittiprol S, Neelakantachar N, Naveen MN, Thirthall J, Gangadhar BN, Shetty, KT (October 2007). "Insulin and insulin-like growth factor-1 abnormalities in antipsychotic-naive schizophrenia". American Journal of Psychiatry. 164 (10): 1557–1560. doi:10.1176/appi.ajp.2007.07020233. PMID 17898347.
- Spence SA, Hunter MD, Farrow TF, Green RD, Leung DH, Hughes CJ, Ganesan-Venkatasubramanian (November 2004). "A cognitive neurobiological account of deception: evidence from functional neuroimaging". Philosophical Transactions of the Royal Society of London. Series B, Biological Sciences. 359 (2): 1755–62. doi:10.1098/rstb.2004.1555. PMC 1693447. PMID 15590616.

== See also ==
- Mechanisms of schizophrenia
- Neuroimaging
