= National Institute of Mental Health and Neurosciences =

Mental hospital in Bangalore, India

- Official insignia of the institute
- Other name: NIMHANS
- Motto: samatvaṃ yoga ucyate
- Type: Public medical school
- Established: 1847; 179 years ago as Bangalore Lunatic Asylum; 1925; 101 years ago as Government Mental Hospital; 27 December 1974; 51 years ago as NIMHANS
- Budget: ₹917.21 crore (US$95 million)(2026)
- President: Union Minister of Health and Family Welfare
- Director: Dr. Janardhan Reddy (interim)
- Academic staff: 249
- Students: 553
- Postgraduates: 269
- Doctoral students: 284
- Location: Bengaluru, Karnataka, India; 12°56′22.4″N 77°35′55.7″E
- Campus: 184 acres (74 ha); Urban (Note: Total area of the institute includes 144 acres of the existing campuses and 40 acres of land acquired for the construction of Bangalore north campus)
- Mascot: White Swan
- Website: nimhans.ac.in
- Government of India (MoHFW)

Organisation
- Type: Specialized Teaching hospital

Services
- Standards: NMC
- Emergency department: Level 1 Neuro-Trauma Centre
- Beds: 1,096

The National Institute of Mental Health and Neuro-Sciences (NIMHANS) is a medical institution in Bengaluru, India. NIMHANS serves as the apex centre for mental health education and neuroscience research in the country. It is an Institute of National Importance operating autonomously under the Ministry of Health and Family Welfare. NIMHANS is widely regarded as a leading institution in India for super-specialty training across psychiatry, neurology, and neurosurgery, and has been listed among Newsweek’s World’s Best Hospitals.

== History ==
The history of the institute dates back to 1847, when the Bangalore Lunatic Asylum was founded. In 1925, the Government of Mysore renamed the asylum as the Mental Hospital. The Mysore Government Mental Hospital became the first institute in India for postgraduate training in psychiatry.

The National Institute of Mental Health and Neurosciences (NIMHANS) was the result of the amalgamation of the erstwhile State Mental Hospital and the All India Institute of Mental Health (AIIMH) in 1954. The institute was established on 27 December 1974 as an autonomous body under the Societies Registration Act to lead in the area of medical service and research in the country.

On 14 November 1994, NIMHANS was conferred a deemed university status by the University Grants Commission with academic autonomy. The institute has been declared as an Institute of National Importance by an act of parliament in 2012. In March 2017, the Government of India passed the Mental Healthcare Bill 2016, which also proposes to set up NIMHANS-like institutions across the nation.In 2017, then-Governor of Jharkhand, Droupadi Murmu, advocated for upgrading the Central Institute of Psychiatry (CIP) in Ranchi similar to the NIMHANS in Bengaluru.

== Campus ==
NIMHANS has five campuses in the city, spread over an area of 174 acres of urban establishments, which includes 40 acres of an under-construction Bangalore North campus. The main campuses of the institute are located in Byrasandra (hospital wing) and Lakkasandra (academic and administrative wing) localities on either side of the Hosur Road. The 'Community Mental Health Center' is located in the Sakalawara area on Bannerghatta Road. The 'NIMHANS Centre for Well Being' is situated in a residential area in BTM Layout. A state-of-the-art convention centre located in the main campus frequently hosts international conferences, seminars, trade shows, expositions, and media events.

NIMHANS campus
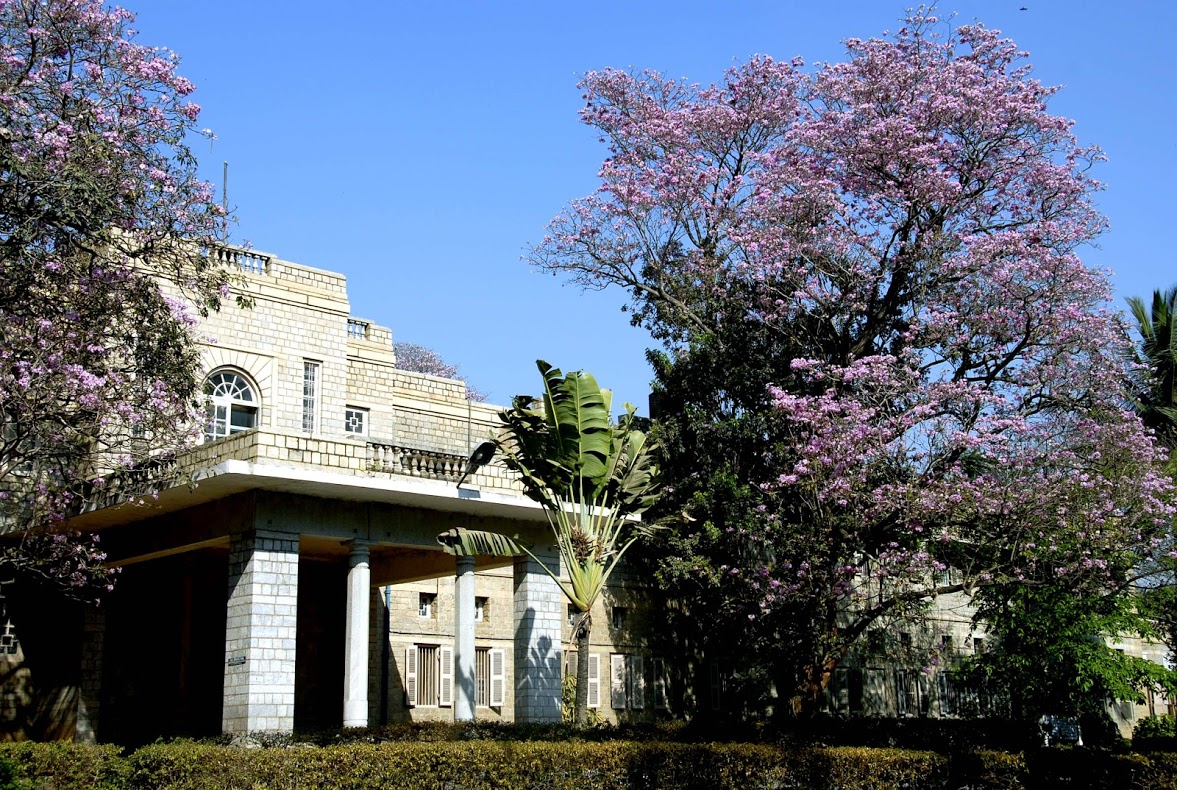
Department of Psychiatry

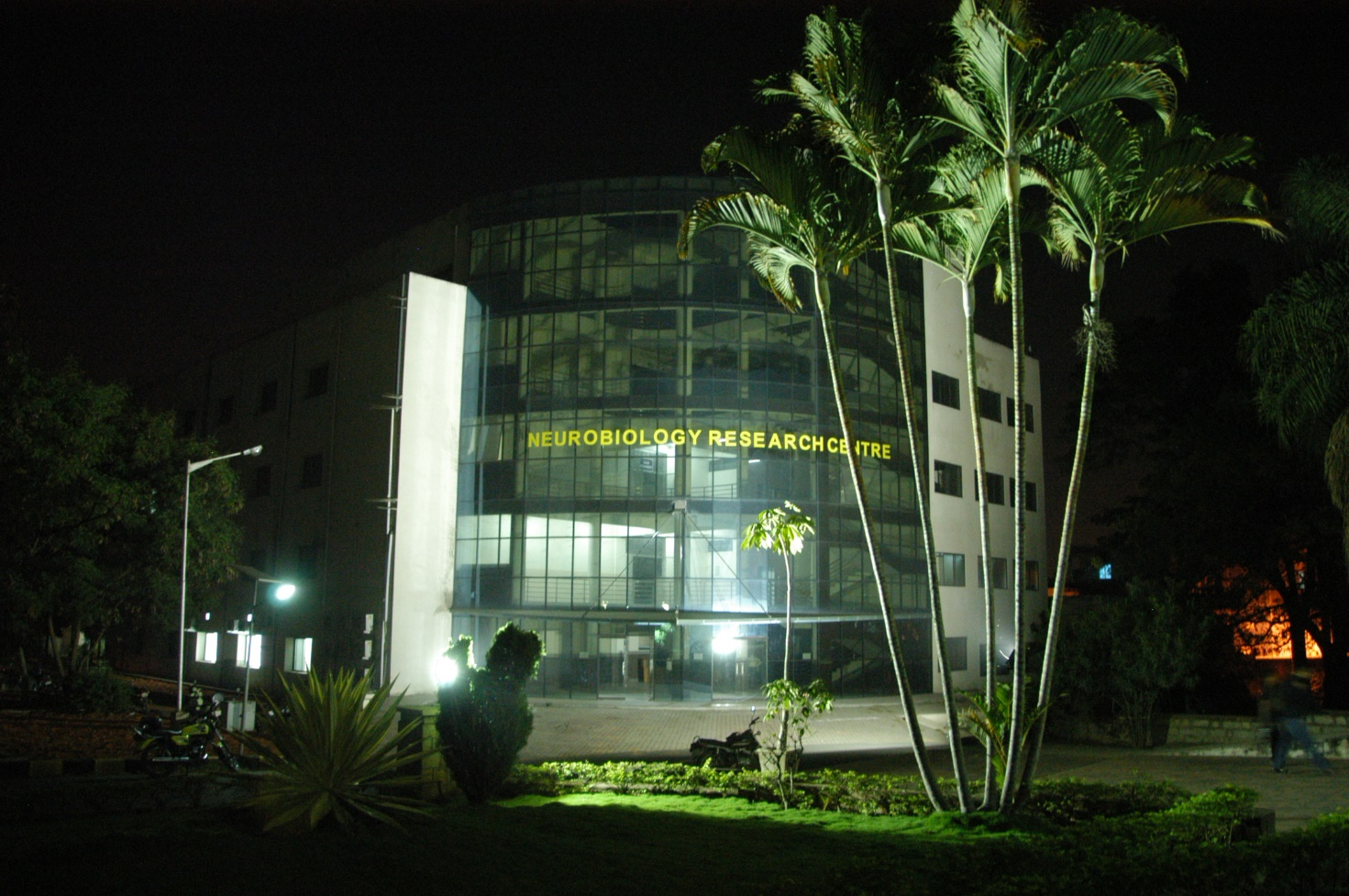
Neurobiology Research Centre

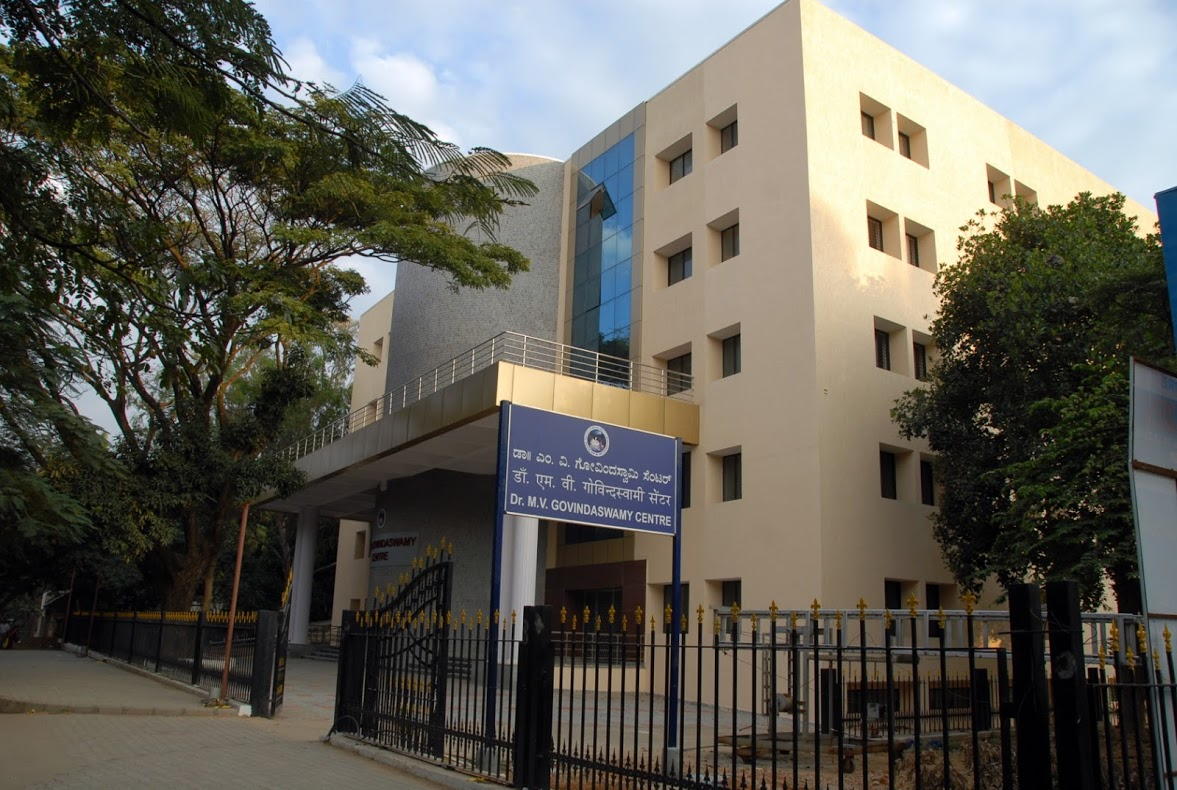
MV Govindaswamy Centre

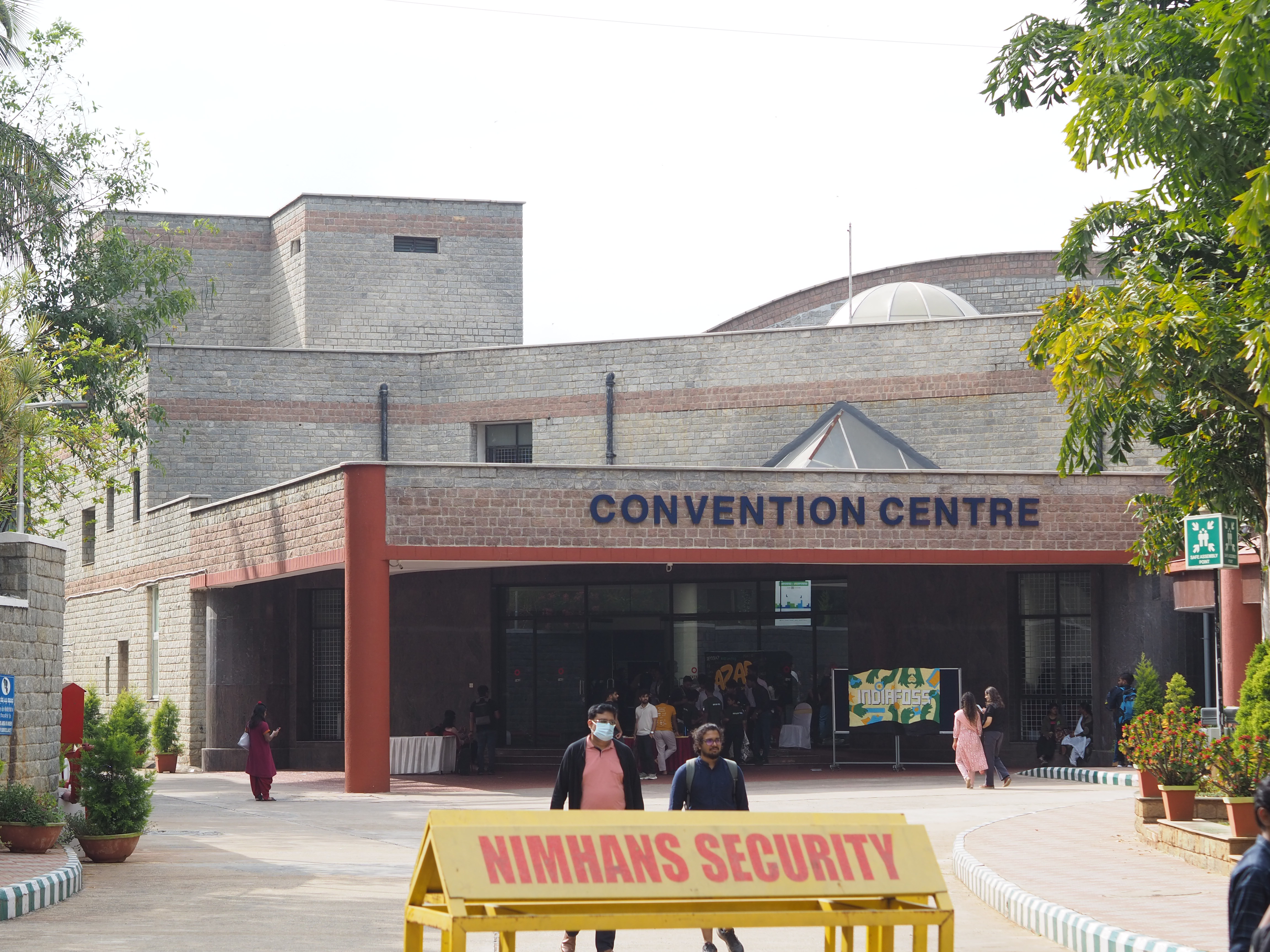
NIMHANS Convention Centre

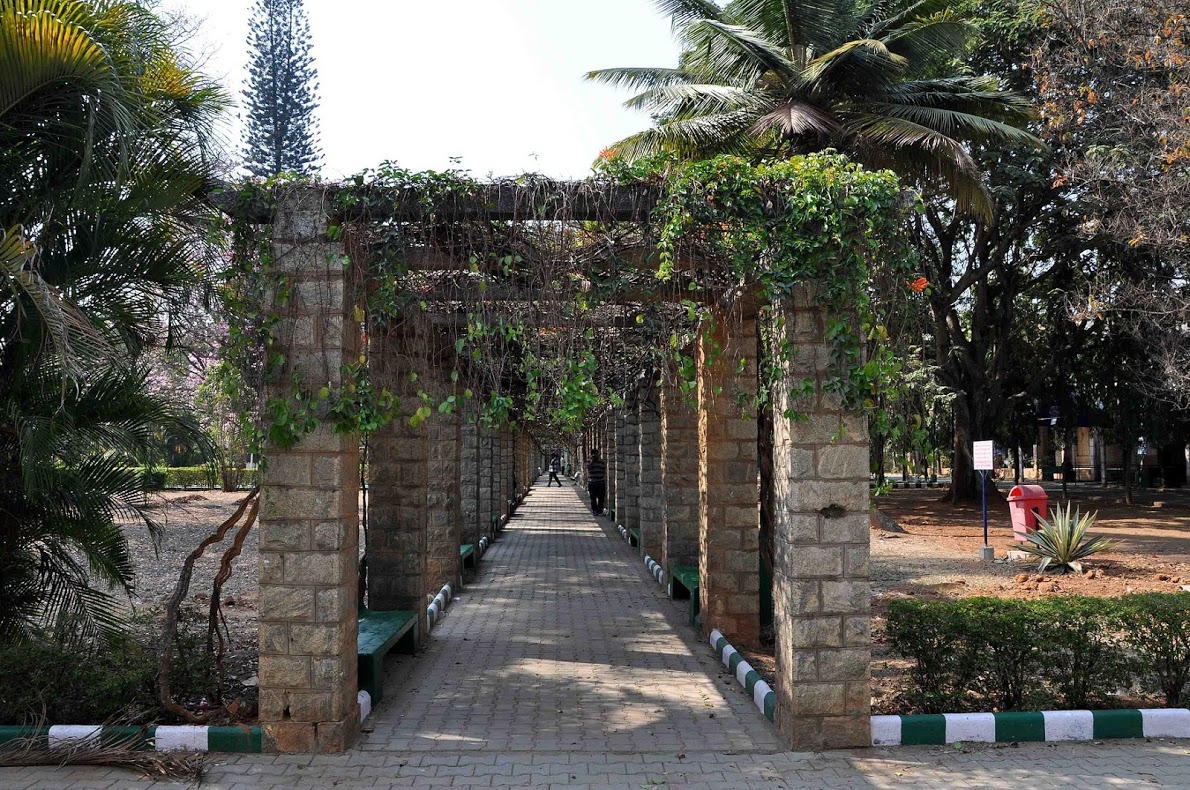
Rehabilitation Centre Park

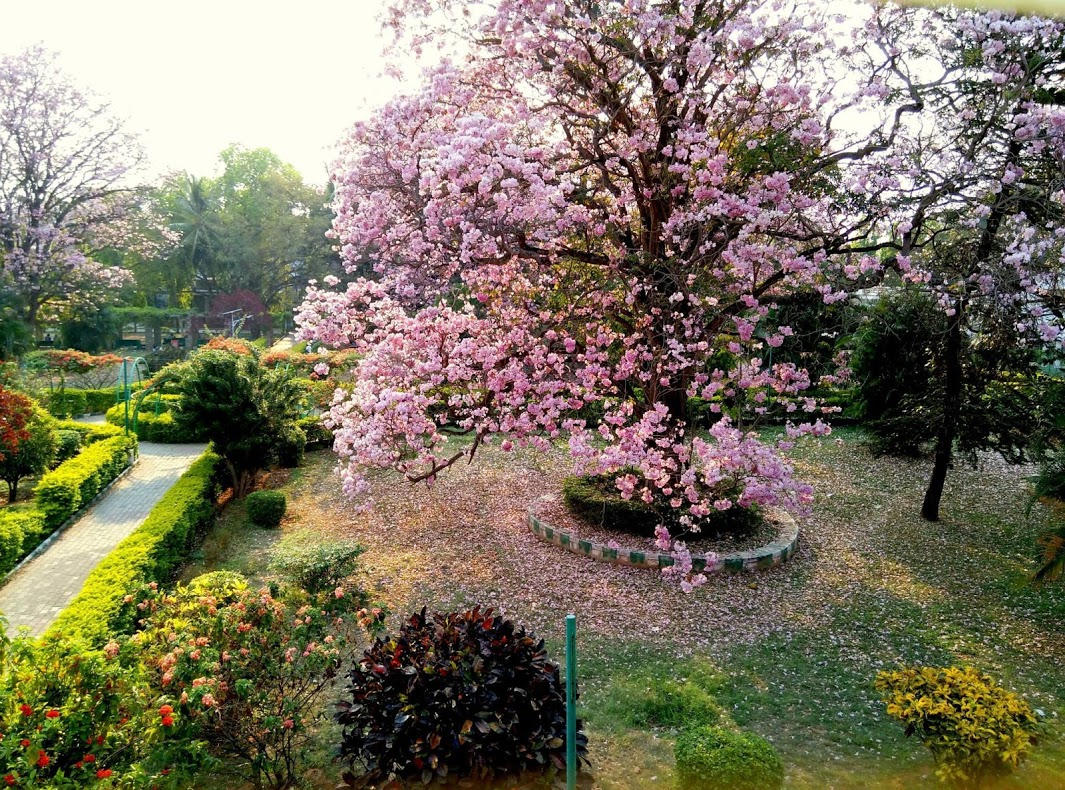
NIMHANS Central Garden

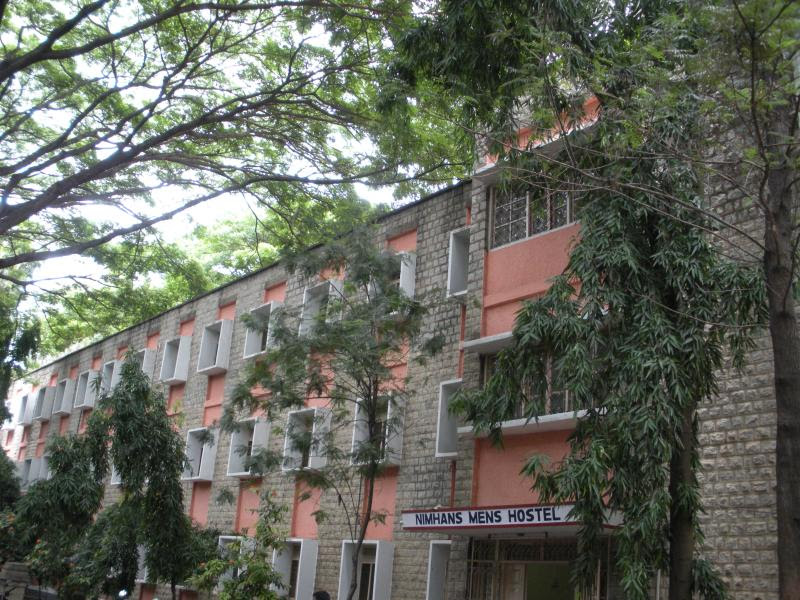
NIMHANS Men's Hostel

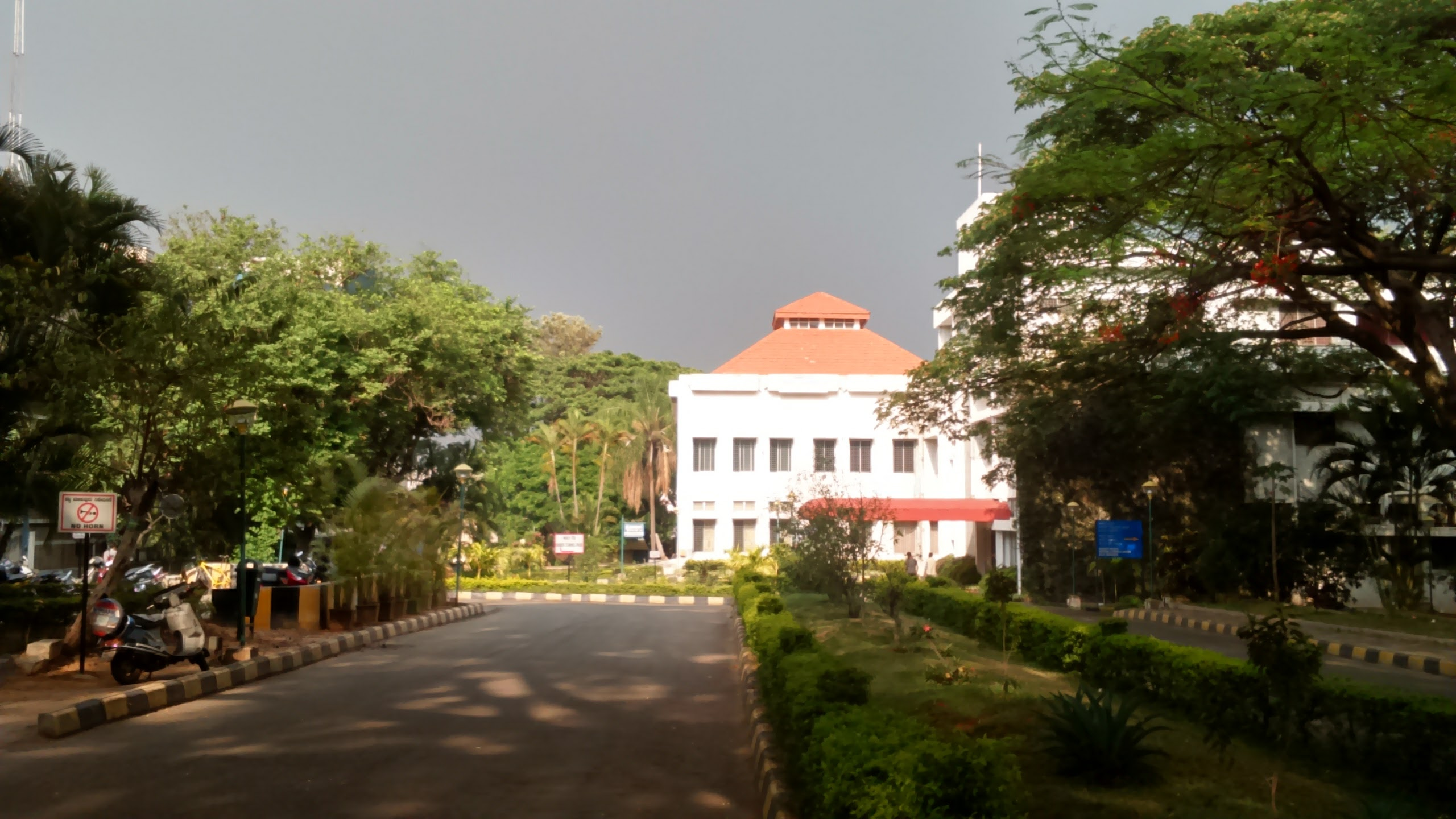
NIMHANS Lakkasandra campus

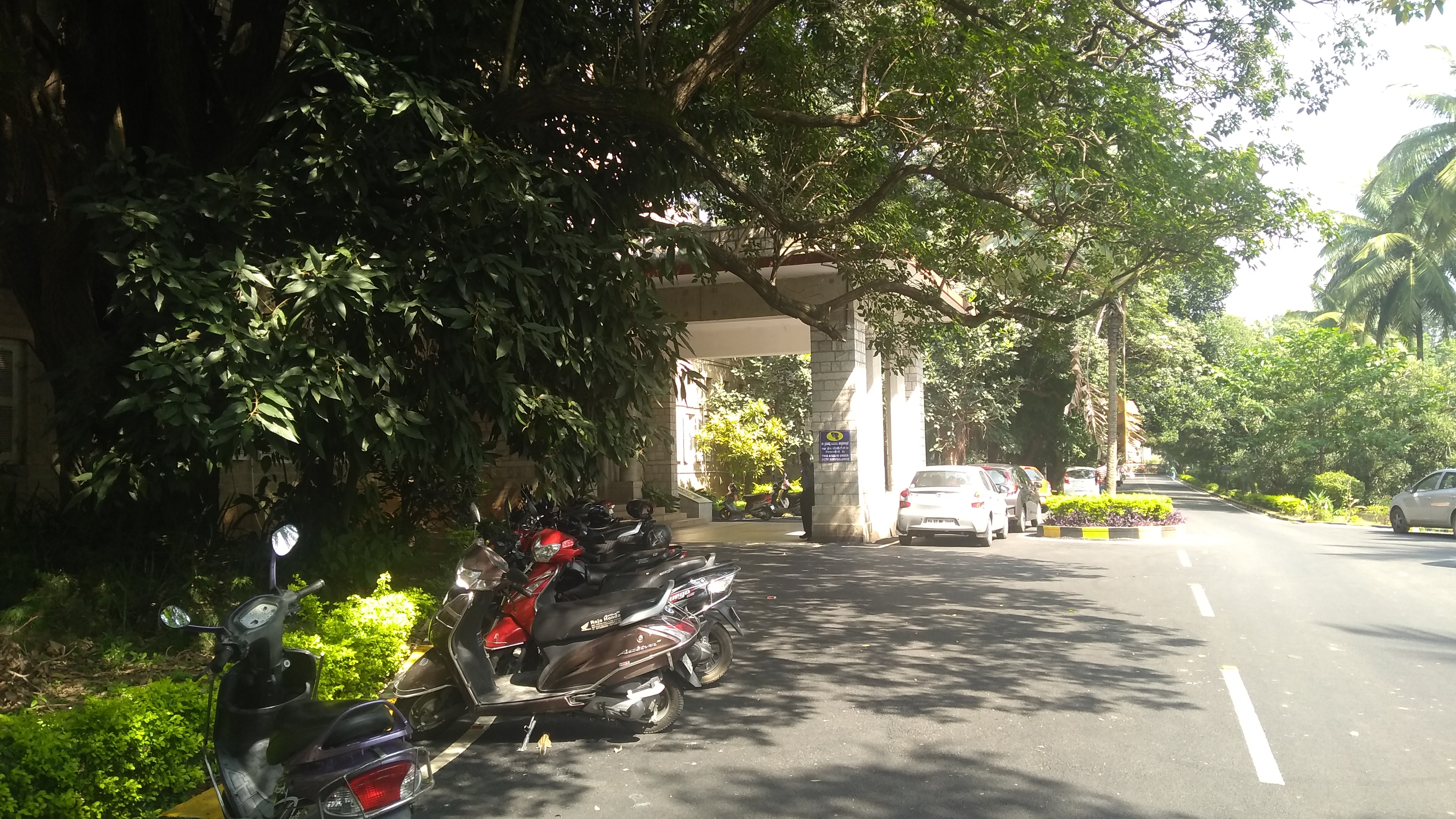
NIMHANS Byrasandra campus

== Organization and administration ==
=== Governance ===
Directors of the AIIMH/NIMHANS
- M. V. Govindaswamy (1954–59)
- D. L. N. Murti Rao (1960–62)
- B. D. Punekar (1963)
- Keki Masani (1963–64)
- N. C. Surya (1965–68)
- K. Bhaskaran (1969)
- R. Marthanda Varma (1969–77)
- K. S. Mani (1977–78)
- R. Marthanda Varma (1978–79)
- G. N. Narayana Reddy (1979–89)
- S. M. Channabasavanna (1989–97)
- M. Gourie-Devi (1997–2002)
- D. Nagaraja (2002–10)
- S. K. Shankar (2010)
- P. Satish Chandra (2010–15)
- N. Pradhan (2015)
- G. S. Umamaheswara Rao (2015)
- B. N. Gangadhar (2016–2020)
- G. Gururaj (2020–2021)
- Satish Chandra Girimaji (2021)
- Pratima Murthy (2021–2026)
- Prabha S. Chandra (interim) (2026)
- Janardhan Reddy (interim) (2026–present)

The National Institute of Mental Health and Neurosciences is a multidisciplinary institute for patient care and academic pursuit in the frontier area of mental health and neurosciences. The priority gradient adopted at the institute is service, manpower development and research. A multidisciplinary integrated approach is the mainstay of this institute, paving the way to translate the results from the bench to the bedside. Several national and international funding organizations provide resources for academic and research activities.

=== Departments ===
- Biophysics
- Biostatistics
- Basic Neurosciences
- Human Genetics
- Neurochemistry
- Neuromicrobiology
- Neuropathology
- Neurophysiology
- Neurovirology
- Mental Health Education
- Clinical Psychology
- Child and adolescent psychiatry
- Psychiatric Social Work
- Psychiatry
- Nursing
- Clinical Neuroscience
- Neurosurgery
- Clinical Psychopharmacology and Neurotoxicology
- Neuroimaging and Interventional Radiology
- Neurology
- Epidemiology
- Neurological Rehabilitation
- Neuroanaesthesia and Neurocritical care
- Psychiatric rehabilitation
- Speech Pathology and Audiology
- Transfusion Medicine and Haematology

=== Central Facilities ===
- Advanced Centre for Ayurveda in Mental Health and Neurosciences
- Central Animal Research Facility
- Sakalwara Community Mental Health Centre
- Centre for Public Health
- Centre for Addiction Medicine
- Biomedical Engineering
- Engineering Section
- Library and Information Centre
- Magneto-encephalography Centre
- PET MRI Centre
- Neurobiology Research Centre
- NIMHANS Centre for Well Being
- Virtual Learning Centre
- Center for Molecular Imaging
- Centre for Brain Mapping
- Gamma Knife Centre
- NIMHANS Health Centre
- NIMHANS Integrated Centre for Yoga
- NIMHANS Gymkhana
- Nutrition and Dietetics Centre
- Physiotherapy Centre
- NIMHANS Digital Academy
- NIMHANS Convention Centre
- NIMHANS Gymkhana
- WHO Collaborating Centre for Injury Prevention and Safety Promotion

== Academics ==
=== Academic programs ===
==== Doctor of Philosophy ====
- Ph.D. in Biophysics
- Ph.D. in Biostatistics
- Ph.D. in Child & Adolescent Psychiatry
- Ph.D. in Clinical Psychology
- Ph.D. in Clinical Neurosciences (ICMR Fellowship)
- Ph.D. in Clinical Psychology
- Ph.D. in Clinical Psychopharmacology & Neurotoxicology
- Ph.D. in Epidemiology
- Ph.D. in History of Psychiatry
- Ph.D. in Human Genetics
- Ph.D. in Integrative Medicine
- Ph.D. in Mental Health Rehabilitation
- Ph.D. in Neurochemistry
- Ph.D. in Neuroimaging & Interventional Radiology
- Ph.D. in Neurological Rehabilitation
- Ph.D. in Neurology
- Ph.D. in Neuroimaging & Interventional Radiology
- Ph.D. in Neuromicrobiology
- Ph.D. in Neuropathology
- Ph.D. in Neurophysiology
- Ph.D. in Neurovirology
- Ph.D. in Nursing
- Ph.D. in Psychiatric Social Work
- Ph.D. in Psychosocial Support
- Ph.D. in Psychiatry
- Ph.D. in Public Health
- Ph.D. in Speech Pathology & Audiology

==== Super Speciality Medicine Courses ====
- DM in Neuroimaging and Interventional Radiology
- DM in Neurology (Post MBBS)
- DM in Neurology (Post MD/DNB)
- DM in Child & Adolescent Psychiatry
- DM in Addiction Psychiatry
- DM in Forensic Psychiatry
- DM in Geriatric Psychiatry
- DM in Neuroanaesthesia & Neurocritical Care
- DM in Neuropathology
- M.Ch. in Neurosurgery (Post MBBS)
- M.Ch. in Neurosurgery (Post MS/DNB)

==== Post-graduate Degree/Fellowship ====
- MD in Psychiatry
- MD in Ayurveda Manovigyan Evam Manasa Roga
- Fellowship in Psychosocial Support in Disaster Management
- Fellowship in Geriatric Mental Health Care
- Fellowship in Mental Health Education
- Fellowship in Geriatric Mental Health Nursing
- Fellowship in Psychiatric Rehabilitation
- Fellowship in Psychosocial Care for elderly
- M.Phil. in Clinical Psychology
- M.Phil. in Psychiatric Social Work
- M.Sc. in Biostatistics
- M.Sc. in Neurosciences
- M.Sc. in Yoga Therapy
- Master in Public Health
- M.Sc. in Neuroscience Nursing
- M.Sc. in Psychiatric Nursing

==== Post-doctoral Fellowship ====
- Child & Adolescent Psychiatry
- Neuroanaesthesia
- Neurocritical Care
- Neuroinfection
- Hospital Infection Control
- Epilepsy
- Movement Disorders
- Neuromuscular Disorder
- Stroke
- Neuropathology
- Paediatric Neurology
- Transfusion Medicine
- Neurological Rehabilitation
- Acute Care & Emergency Psychiatry
- Community Mental Health
- Addiction Medicine
- Forensic Psychiatry
- Consultation-Liaison Psychiatry
- Geriatric Psychiatry
- Obsessive Compulsive disorder & related disorders
- Clinical Neurosciences & Therapeutics in Schizophrenia
- Non-Invasive Brain Stimulation of Psychiatric disorders
- Cognitive Neurosciences
- Women's Mental Health

==== Undergraduate Programmes ====
- B.Sc. Nursing
- B.Sc. Anaesthesia Technology
- B.Sc. Radiography
- B.Sc. Clinical Neurophysiology Technology

=== Rankings ===
University rankings

Medical – India
- NIRF (2024): 4

The National Institute of Mental Health and Neurosciences has been ranked 4th among medical institutions in India by the National Institutional Ranking Framework in 2024.

=== Mental Health Policy and Debates ===
NIMHANS plays a central role in India's mental health programs focused on accessibility, early intervention, and community care. As the nodal center for the Government of India's Tele-MANAS (Tele Mental Health Assistance and Networking Across States), NIMHANS supports a 24/7 tele-mental health helpline providing free, multilingual counseling and referral services nationwide. In addition, NIMHANS contributes to capacity building under the National Mental Health Programme and leads digital and community outreach initiatives targeting underserved populations.

During and after the COVID-19 pandemic, the National Institute of Mental Health and Neurosciences led India's mental health response through helplines and guidelines, though some critics argued this risked over-medicalizing socioeconomic distress. A 2025 study reported by The New Indian Express on neurological complications in COVID-19 patients was also debated after its findings were linked in public discourse to vaccine safety, raising concerns about misinterpretation.

Experts from the National Institute of Mental Health and Neurosciences were closely involved in shaping and interpreting the Mental Healthcare Act, 2017, particularly its rights-based provisions, while also warning that safeguards such as restrictions on electroconvulsive therapy (ECT) could pose challenges in clinical practice and implementation.

In May 2015, the institute's faculty association criticized the 'Juvenile Justice Bill' that was tabled in Parliament. Preeti Jacob, from the Department of Child and Adolescent Psychiatry, was quoted as saying "Juveniles are less culpable and are much more amenable to rehabilitative efforts and thus should not be transferred to the adult criminal justice system. The assessments that are being proposed in the bill in order to ascertain the mental capacity to commit an offense are arbitrary and unscientific."

In December 2014, it was reported that a soldier from the Indian Navy was being held in NIMHANS for a month to evaluate whether he was suffering from mental illness, after acting as a whistleblower. After the month-long evaluation, it was concluded that the Navy person was not suffering from any mental illness. In July 2013, TOI reported that NIMHANS was collaborating with the Central Bureau of Investigation to train its staff with interrogation techniques.

In 2012, the central government approached NIMHANS to suppress anti-nuclear protests regarding the construction of the Kudankulam Nuclear Power Plant. The government asked NIMHANS to dispatch psychiatrists to Kudankulam to counsel protesters. To fulfill the plan, NIMHANS formed a team of six members, all from the Department of Social Psychiatry. The psychiatrists were sent to get a "peek into the protesters' minds" and help them learn the importance of the plant.

In 2008, a reality show contestant, Shinjini Sen, after getting reprimanded by the TV show judges, temporarily lost her voice and physical mobility. It was alleged by the media that the television show judges' behavior caused such disability. To resolve her case, she was flown from Kolkata to Bangalore's NIMHANS to be treated for a neurobiological condition. Professor B N Gangadhar, the then medical superintendent, told the press, "We can say at this juncture that she could be suffering from depression. Depression does not lead to permanent loss of speech or physical disability. We are diagnosing why that has happened. There could be complex neurological factors leading to such conditions."

== Notable people ==
NIMHANS has a strong alumni network of medical scientists and doctors who hold many prestigious positions across the world. Some of the prominent people associated with the institute include clinical psychologists H. Narayan Murthy, Radhika Chandiramani, Satwant Pasricha, Elayidath Muhammad, philosophers and yoga therapists S. K. Ramachandra Rao H. R. Nagendra, psychiatrists M. Sarada Menon, Shekhar Seshadri, Jaswant Singh Neki, Valsamma Eapen, neuroscientists, Akhilesh Pandey Turaga Desiraju, S. K. Shankar, Vijayalakshmi Ravindranath, Ganesan Venkatasubramanian Bilikere Dwarakanath, neurologists Naeem Sadiq, Sunil Pradhan, and neurosurgeons, N. K. Venkataramana, R. Marthanda Varma among others.

== Bibliography ==
- Willford, Andrew (24 January 2022). "'Do You Hear Voices, or Do You Think You Hear Voices?': Malevolence and Modernity in the Psychiatric Clinic". South Asia: Journal of South Asian Studies. 45 (1): 164–182. doi:10.1080/00856401.2022.2018639. S2CID 246342737.

== See also ==
- Mental health in India
