= Valsamma Eapen =

Psychiatrist

Valsamma Eapen AO
- Born: Kerala, India
- Education: T.D Medical College Alleppey; University of London
- Occupation: Psychiatrist
- Known for: Developing the Quality of Life in Autism (QoLA) scale

Valsamma Eapen is a chair of infant, child and adolescent psychiatry at UNSW Sydney. She is a fellow of the Royal Australian and New Zealand College of Psychiatrists, and the Royal College of Psychiatrists, UK.

== Education ==
Eapen was born in Kerala, India and completed her secondary education in Trivandrum. After graduating in medicine from T.D Medical College Alleppey, she trained at the National Institute of Mental Health and Neurosciences in Bangalore, India, and in the UK, through the University College Hospital and North London Teaching Hospitals rotational training scheme and advanced training through the Great Ormond Street Hospital for Sick Children and Institute Of Child Health. She undertook her PhD at the University of London, with research carried out at the National Hospital for Neurology and Neurosurgery, Queen Square, London on the genetics of Tourette syndrome.

== Research and career ==
Her academic career began at the University College London and she then moved to United Arab Emirates University before taking up her current appointment as professor and chair of infant, child and adolescent psychiatry at UNSW Sydney and as clinical academic and head of the academic unit of child psychiatry at South West Sydney Local Health District.

As a clinician researcher, she has translated research findings into practice and policy applications such as developing service delivery frameworks for early identification of developmental problems in preschool children including the Watch Me Grow webapp. Further, her team examined the pivotal role of oxytocin in attachment, separation anxiety and child development, offering translational opportunities for identifying women at risk in the antenatal period to improve intergenerational outcomes.

Her research has included genetic, epidemiological, and phenomenological studies as well as clinical interventions in Tourette syndrome. Further, she has contributed significantly to research in autism spectrum disorders, building evidence base on early intervention and leading the autism subtyping program in collaboration with the Autism Co-operative Research Centre (Autism CRC). A world first research through the NSW ASELCC in Liverpool – where Eapen is the research lead – showed the benefits of the Early Start Denver Model in reducing maladaptive behaviours in preschool children with autism spectrum disorder.

Eapen was part of a four-member executive team that developed the National Guideline for the Assessment and Diagnosis of Autism Spectrum Disorders through the Autism CRC in collaboration with the National Disability Insurance Agency and endorsed by the National Health and Medical Research Council (NHMRC). Launched November 2017, this is being utilised across Australia and adopted by the NDIS.

Eapen has developed the Quality of Life in Autism (QoLA) scale, which has been adopted for use by more than 73 teams across 25 countries and translated into several different languages.

The Watch Me Grow study, funded through an NHMRC Partnership grant with NSW Health, involved a 2000-strong birth cohort study that examined the modifiable risk factors for developmental disability. This study found evidence of an 'inverse care law', whereby those children at highest risk (e.g. mothers born overseas and of lower educational/income levels) were the least likely to access the surveillance program.

In an effort to address the current inequity in access to developmental services in low resourced environments, Eapen developed the Watch Me Grow Electronic Platform (WMG-E), a webapp for engaging parents in developmental monitoring during opportunistic contacts such as immunisation visits. This webapp was developed in collaboration with the Random Hacks of Kindness community of technologists – a joint initiative between Microsoft, Google, Yahoo!, NASA, and the World Bank. This is currently being disseminated in Australia and overseas to establish a Universal Developmental Surveillance program with equitable access to all pre-school children. It was featured at the American Psychiatric Association 2019 conference as 'one of three exemplars of innovative global mental health programs'.

Her book Where There is No Child Psychiatrist is being used to improve skills for professionals on mental health problems, particularly in developing countries.

== Awards and honors ==
- Fellow of the Royal Australian and New Zealand College of Psychiatrists
- Fellow of the Royal College of Psychiatrists
- Lady Fairfax AC OBE Distinguished Researcher Award
- Hamdan Award for Original Research Paper Published in Emirates Medical Journal by Hamdan Medical Award in 2004
- Fellow of the Australian Academy of Health and Medical Sciences (2025)
- Officer of the Order of Australia (2026)

== Personal life ==
Eapen is a board director (voluntary) for Karitane Parenting Services. As the medical publicity liaison officer for the Tourette Syndrome Association Australia, she leads the annual Tourette Awareness Week activities.

== Selected publications ==
Eapen has written six books and more than 300 journal publications.

- Using whole-exome sequencing to identify inherited causes of autism.
- Genome-wide association study of obsessive-compulsive disorder.
- The international prevalence, epidemiology, and clinical phenomenology of Tourette syndrome: a cross-cultural perspective.
- Preschool psychopathology reported by parents in 23 societies: testing the seven-syndrome model of the child behavior checklist for ages 1.5–5.
- Evidence for autosomal dominant transmission in Tourette's syndrome.
- International comparisons of behavioral and emotional problems in preschool children: parents' reports from 24 societies.
