= R. Marthanda Varma =

Indian neurosurgeon (died 2015)

- Born: Mavelikkara, Kerala, India
- Died: 10 March 2015; Bengaluru, Karnataka, India
- Occupation: Neurosurgeon
- Known for: Varma's Technique (Neurosurgical procedure)
- Spouse: Malathi
- Children: Two sons
- Parent: Aswathynnal Kutty Amma Thampuran
- Awards: Padma Shri; Rajyotsava Prashasti; IASSMD Distinguished Achievement Award; Citizen Extraordinary of Bangalore Award; Sir Visvesvaraya Award

Ravivarma Marthanda Varma was an Indian neurosurgeon, one of the pioneers of Indian neurosurgery and the founder director of the National Institute of Mental Health and Neurosciences (NIMHANS). He was the originator of a new surgical procedure for treating Parkinson's disease which later came to be known as Varma's Technique. He was a former Deputy Director General of Health Services, Government of India and an honorary surgeon to R. Venkataraman, former president of India. He was honoured by the Government of India in 1972 with Padma Shri, the fourth highest Indian civilian award.

== Biography ==
Marthanda Varma was born in the Royal family of Mavelikkara which had close family connections with the Travancore royal family, his mother, Aswathynaal Kutty Amma Thampuran, was the sister of the then Maharani of Travancore. After graduating in medicine, he did master's course at the University of Bristol and completed the Fellowship of the Royal College of Surgeons of Edinburgh, becoming one of the first five neurosurgeons of India. He returned to India in 1958 and joined the All India Institute of Mental Health (AIIMH), a mental hospital based in Bangalore, Karnataka. as the professor of neurosurgery. He became the director of the institution in 1969 and held the post until 1974.

When the All India Institute of Mental Health was reconstituted as the National Institute of Mental Health and Neurosciences with the participation from the state and central governments in 1974, Varma was chosen as its founder director, a post he retained until 1977. In 1977, he was appointed as the deputy director of Health Services by the Government of India for a one-year term. He returned to NIMHANS in 1978 and served as the director until his superannuation in 1979. He also served as the dean of the faculty of mental health and neurosciences of Bangalore University, as the advisor to the government of India on mental health and neurosurgery and as the honorary surgeon to R. Venkataraman, former president of India.

Varma was credited with research on Parkinson's disease and was known to have developed a minimally invasive technique for the control of the disease, the procedure now known as Varma's Technique. The procedure, first introduced in 1963 by Varma, involved accessing the subthaamic nucleaus in brain through foramen ovale using syringes with the whole procedure lasting less than 20 minutes. He presented a paper on the technique at the international conference of Neurosurgeons at Copenhagen in 1965. He presented more than 40 medical papers in medical conferences and was credited with the publication of over 20 articles.

Marthanda Varma was married to Malathi, a lecturer at APS college and the couple had two sons. The elder is Ravi Gopal Varma, also a neurosurgeon and the younger is Shashi Gopal Varma. He died on 10 March 2015 at M. S. Ramaiah Memorial Hospital, Bangalore, at the age of 93, succumbing to age related illnesses.

Varma also mentored many private hospitals in Bangalore, such as Mallige Medical Centre, Manipal Hospital, and MS Ramaiah Hospital. He was also an independent director at Mallige Medical Centre.

Varma, an elected fellow of the National Academy of Medical Sciences, received the Rajyotsava Prashasti from the government of Karnataka in 1969. The Government of India awarded him the civilian honour of Padma Shri in 1972 and he received the Distinguished Achievement Award from the World Congress of the International Association for the Scientific Study of Mental Deficiency (IASSMD) in 1982. He was also a recipient of the Citizen Extraordinary of Bangalore Award in 1967 and the Sir Visvesvaraya Award in 1998. The Neurological Society of Bangalore has instituted an annual oration award in his honour. He remained the Professor Emeritus of NIMHANS after his retirement until his death. He is also a recipient of the Lifetime Achievement Award of Madras Neuro Trust.
