= Shekhar Seshadri =

Indian psychiatrist

Shekhar P. Seshadri is an Indian psychiatrist. He is a professor of the Department of Child and Adolescent Psychiatry in NIMHANS, Bangalore, India. He is widely quoted by the media and has for decades been associated with numerous mental health initiatives. He is the older brother of the actress, Meenakshi Seshadri. He has co-authored two books and has also written chapters as a guest author. He is known for his research work in life skills training, child sexual abuse, masculinities, women's mental health issues and sexual minorities.

== Early life and academic career ==
Seshadri is married to Professor Anisha Shah, a Senior Professor of Clinical Psychology at the NIMHANS for more than two decades.

He completed his MBBS from Maulana Azad Medical College from 1975 to 1980. He then did his DPM and then M.D. in Psychiatry from NIMHANS in 1983 and 1985 respectively. He then held various academic positions at the NIMHANS, Bangaluru from 1986 to 2021 when he retired as a Senior Professor. Upon retirement, he is associated with SAMVAAD as a Senior Advisor. SAMVAAD is a National Initiative and Integrated Resources for Child Protection, Mental Health, & Psychosocial Care established by NIMHANS with the support of the Ministry of Women and Child Development, Government of India.

== Awards ==
Shekhar Seshadri was awarded the Keshav Desiraju Memorial Award for Outstanding Public Service in Mental Health, 2024, for his exceptional contributions to child and adolescent mental health in India.

In 2012, Dr. Seshadri was awarded the Dr. Achar Oration Award at the Annual Conference of Indian Psychiatric Society.

== Bibliography ==
- Parenting: The Art and Science of Nurturing, (co-authored by Nirupama Rao, Byword Books, 2013)
- Play: Experiential Methodologies in Developmental and Therapeutic Settings, (co-authored by Shubhada A. Maitra, Orient Blackswan, 2012)
