= National Institute of Mental Health and Neuro Sciences, Bangalore Act, 2012 =

Act of the Parliament of India

The National Institute of Mental Health and Neuro Sciences, Bangalore Act, 2012 is an act of the Parliament of India promulgated to give the status of Institute of National Importance to National Institute of Mental Health and Neurosciences, Bangalore. The Bill establishes NIMHANS as a more autonomous. NIMHANS is the fourth medical institute in the country to get this status after All India Institute of Medical Sciences, Postgraduate Institute of Medical Education and Research and Jawaharlal Institute of Postgraduate Medical Education and Research

== Features ==
1. It establishes NIMHANS as corporate body, as it will be out of the purview of MCI. The law states about the objects and functions, the composition of its members, and their powers and functions. It also states that NIMHANS will carry out its functions under the control of the central government
2. The new status is to facilitate inflow of more funds to increase Faculties, to increase infrastructure and to play a greater role.
