= S. K. Shankar =

Indian neuropathologist (1947–2022)

Susarla Krishna Shankar (27 January 1947 – 5 September 2022) was a neuropathologist and neuroscientist who served as a Director of National Institute of Mental Health and Neuro Sciences (NIMHANS), Bengaluru, India. He also served as a Professor and Head of the Department of Neuropathology of NIMHANS from 1998 to 2012. He served in NIMHANS for more than three decades. He founded the first and only Brain Bank in India at NIMHANS to encourage neuroscience research in the nation. He, a former Research Associate in the AIIMS, New Delhi, was regarded as a pioneer in the field of biobanking. He was honored with the Pioneer in Biobanking Award by the Biobank of India Federation and is regarded as the 'Father of brain banking in India'. He also served as the President of the Neuropathology Society of India. He founded the Neuropathology Brain Museum, which is first of its kind in India, housed in NIMHANS. In addition, he was a consultant for the Bioinformatics and Proteomics Laboratory of the Institute of Bioinformatics (IOB) housed in NIMHANS. He was involved in the collaborative project of 'Human Proteome Map' of Institute of Bioinformatics (IOB), NIMHANS and Johns Hopkins University. He had been an elected fellow of various prestigious academic bodies like the College of Pathologists, the National Academy of Medical Sciences and the National Academy of Sciences.
