= Bilikere Dwarakanath =

Indian biologist

Bilikere Srinivasa Rao Dwarakanath
- Born: 4 August 1955 (age 71); Bangalore, India
- Citizenship: India
- Education: Central College, Bangalore
- Known for: Cancer Therapy and Radioprotection
- Awards: DRDO Scientist of the Year; Indira Vasudevan Award, Annual Award of SCRAC; Young Investigator Award, International Congress of Radiation Research (1987, 1991); Award of Excellence, Indian Society of Radiation Biology
- Scientific career
- Fields: Biophysicist and Radiation Biologist
- Workplaces: Indian Academy Group of Institutions, Bengaluru, India; Shanghai Proton and Heavy Ion Center, Shanghai, China; Sri Ramachandra University, Chennai, India; Institute of Nuclear Medicine and Allied Sciences, Delhi, India; National Institute of Mental Health and Neurosciences, Bengaluru, Bowman Gray School of Medicine, Wake Forest University, USA.
- Doctoral advisor: Viney K Jain

Bilikere Srinivasa Rao Dwarakanath (born 4 August 1955) is a molecular biologist and a radiation biologist, working on 2-Deoxy-D-glucose therapy in cancer research. His current research interests are experimental oncology, radiobiology, biological radioprotection and cell signaling in cancer therapy. He is currently the Joint Director of the Institute of Nuclear Medicine and Allied Sciences (INMAS), DRDO, Head, Division of Radiation Biosciences, INMAS, and Adjunct Faculty at the Dr. B. R. Ambedkar Center for Biomedical Research (ACBR), University of Delhi.

He is one of the members of the three-member committee (along with Prof. S.C. Pancholi of the Nuclear Science Centre and Prof. N.C. Goomer of Board of Radiation and Isotope Technology) that was constituted by the Delhi University to probe the incident of radioactivity leakage in a Delhi scrap market, the source of the radioactive material was traced to the chemistry department of the university.

== Early years ==
Dwarakanath was born in Bangalore, Karnataka, India, to B. N. Srinivasa Rao and B. S. Padmavathi as the third among 5 siblings. He obtained his B.Sc. degree in Physics, Chemistry and Mathematics from National College and his M.Sc. degree in Physics from Central College, Bangalore. He obtained his Ph.D. degree from Bangalore University, working at the National Institute of Mental Health and Neurosciences under the radiation biologist Viney K. Jain.

== Institute of Nuclear Medicine and Allied Sciences ==
Dwarakanath joined INMAS, Delhi in April 1994 as "Scientist D". He is currently the Joint Director and HOD, Division of Radiation Biosciences, at INMAS. He has been advocating the use of 2-deoyx-D-glucose as an adjuvant to radiotherapy for the treatment of cancer.

== Professional Appointments ==
- Scientist G, Additional Director and Head, Division of Radiation Biosciences, INMAS, DRDO, Delhi – 2004 to present
- Scientist D, E and Head, Department of Biocybernetics, INMAS – 1994-2004
- Adjunct Faculty, ACBR, University of Delhi – 1999 to present
- Post-doctoral fellow, Bowman Gray School of Medicine, Wake Forest University, Winston-Salem, North Carolina, USA – 1989-1991
- Visiting Scientist, University of Duisburg-Essen, Germany – 1995
- Scientific Assistant, Scientific Officer and assistant professor, Department of Biophysics, NIMHANS, Bangalore – 1979-1994
