= Turaga Desiraju =

Indian neurophysiologist

- Born: 26 May 1935; Machilipatnam, Andhra Pradesh, India
- Died: 1992
- Known for: Neurophysiological studies on sleep and wakefulness
- Awards: 1980 Shanti Swarup Bhatnagar Prize
- Scientific career
- Fields: Neurophysiology; Neuroscience
- Institutions: AIIMS Delhi; NIMHANS

Turaga Desiraju (1935–1992; Machilipatnam, Andhra Pradesh) was an Indian neurophysiologist and a professor at National Institute of Mental Health and Neurosciences (NIMHANS). He was associated with AIIMS Delhi before joining NIMHANS and founded the Department of Neurophysiology at NIMHANS in 1975. He was known for his neurophysiological studies on sleep and wakefulness and his extensive studies on the activities of cerebral cortex helped to widen the understanding of conscious behaviour.

Desiraju's studies on the neuron-physiology of Yoga and theories of consciousness were the corner stones of Project Consciousness, an experimental project promoted by NIMHANS which incorporated Yoga practices. He was the editor of Indian Journal of Physiology and Pharmacology and was an elected fellow of the National Academy of Medical Sciences. The Council of Scientific and Industrial Research, the apex agency of the Government of India for scientific research, awarded him the Shanti Swarup Bhatnagar Prize for Science and Technology, one of the highest Indian science awards for his contributions to Medical Sciences in 1980.

== Selected bibliography ==
- Turaga Desiraju (1973). "Electrophysiology of the frontal granular cortex. II. Patterns of spontaneous discharges of impulses of neurons in the cortex through states of sleep and wakefulness in the monkey". Brain Research. 63 (7): 19–29. doi:10.1016/0006-8993(73)90073-5. PMID 4357968.
- Turaga Desiraju (1990). "Alterations in Neuronal Development under influence of Conditions of Nurture and Heterotopic Transplantation" (PDF). Proceedings of the Indian National Science Academy. 1: 69–72.
- Lakshmana MK, Desiraju T, Raju TR (1993). "Mercuric chloride-induced alterations of levels of noradrenaline, dopamine, serotonin and acetylcholine esterase activity in different regions of rat brain during postnatal development". Arch. Toxicol. 67 (6): 422–427. Bibcode:1993ArTox..67..422L. doi:10.1007/bf01977404. PMID 8215912. S2CID 13154317.
- Singh J, Desiraju T, Raju TR (1997). "Dopamine receptor sub-types involvement in nucleus accumbens and ventral tegmentum but not in medial prefrontal cortex: on self-stimulation of lateral hypothalamus and ventral mesencephalon". Behav. Brain Res. 86 (2): 171–179. doi:10.1016/s0166-4328(96)02263-2. PMID 9134152. S2CID 37306992.
- Singh J, Desiraju T, Raju TR (1997). "Cholinergic and GABAergic modulation of self-stimulation of lateral hypothalamus and ventral tegmentum: effects of carbachol, atropine, bicuculline, and picrotoxin". Physiol. Behav. 61 (3): 411–418. doi:10.1016/s0031-9384(96)00452-0. PMID 9089760. S2CID 25041665.
