= Neurobiology Research Centre =

Indian research centre

Coordinates: 12°56′26.3″N 77°35′55.6″E

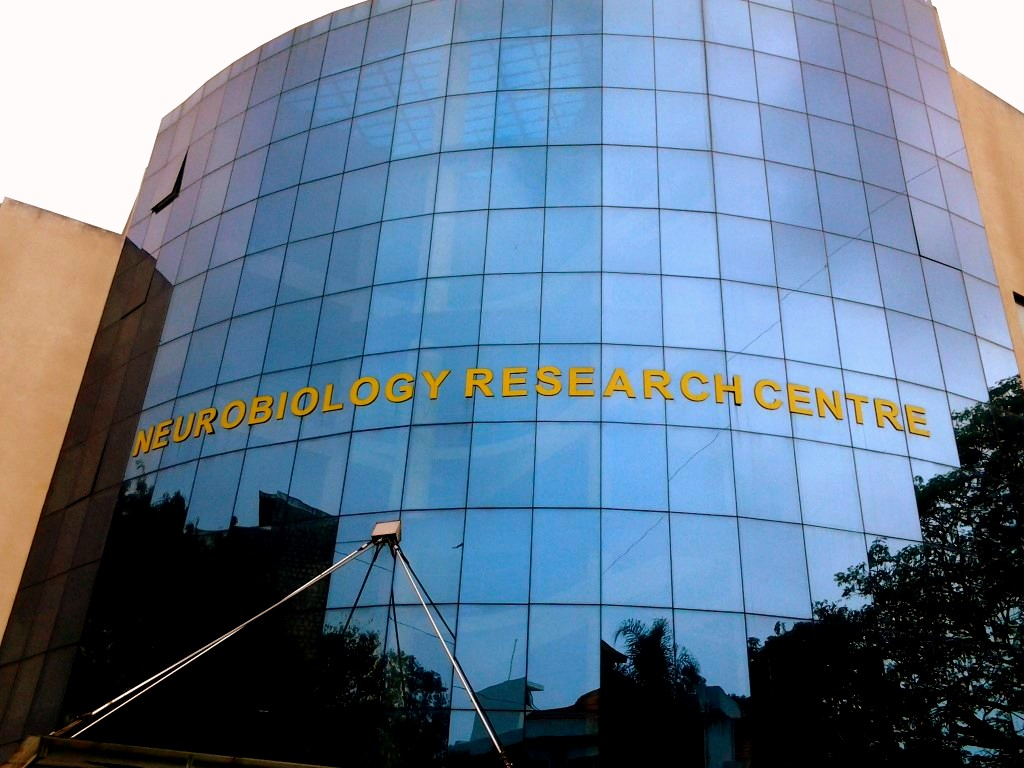
- Abbreviation: NRC
- Formation: 2007
- Type: Public
- Headquarters: Bangalore, India
- Location: NIMHANS, Hosur Road, Bangalore-560029
- Co-ordinator: Prof. BS Shankaranarayana Rao
- Parent organization: NIMHANS, India
- Website: Official Webpage

The Neurobiology Research Center (NRC) is a specialized research centre in the premises of the National Institute of Mental Health and Neurosciences, Bangalore, India. The centre provides infrastructure to support translational research and development of cutting-edge technology in frontier areas of neuroscience. NRC houses fourteen research laboratories and four central facilities, including the Human Brain Museum, the only one of its kind in India.

== Facilities and infrastructure ==
Central facilities
Human Brain Tissue Repository
Neuropathology Brain Museum
Centre for Advanced Research for Innovation in Mental Health and Neurosciences
Central Facility for Millipore Water Purification System, Liquid Nitrogen and Waste Disposal

=== Research laboratories ===
- Advanced Flow Cytometry Laboratory
- Bioinformatics & Proteomics Laboratory
- Cell Culture & Stem Cell Biology Laboratory
- Centre for Brain and Mind
- Electrophysiology Laboratory
- Music Cognition Laboratory
- Metabolic Laboratory
- Multi-modal Brain Image Analysis Laboratory
- Molecular Biology Laboratories – Communicable and Non-communicable
- Molecular Genetics Laboratory
- Neuromuscular Laboratory
- Neurotoxicology Laboratory
- Neuro-Oncology Laboratory
- Optical Imaging & Electrophysiology Laboratory
- Translational Psychiatry Laboratory
