= Kanke =

- Census Town
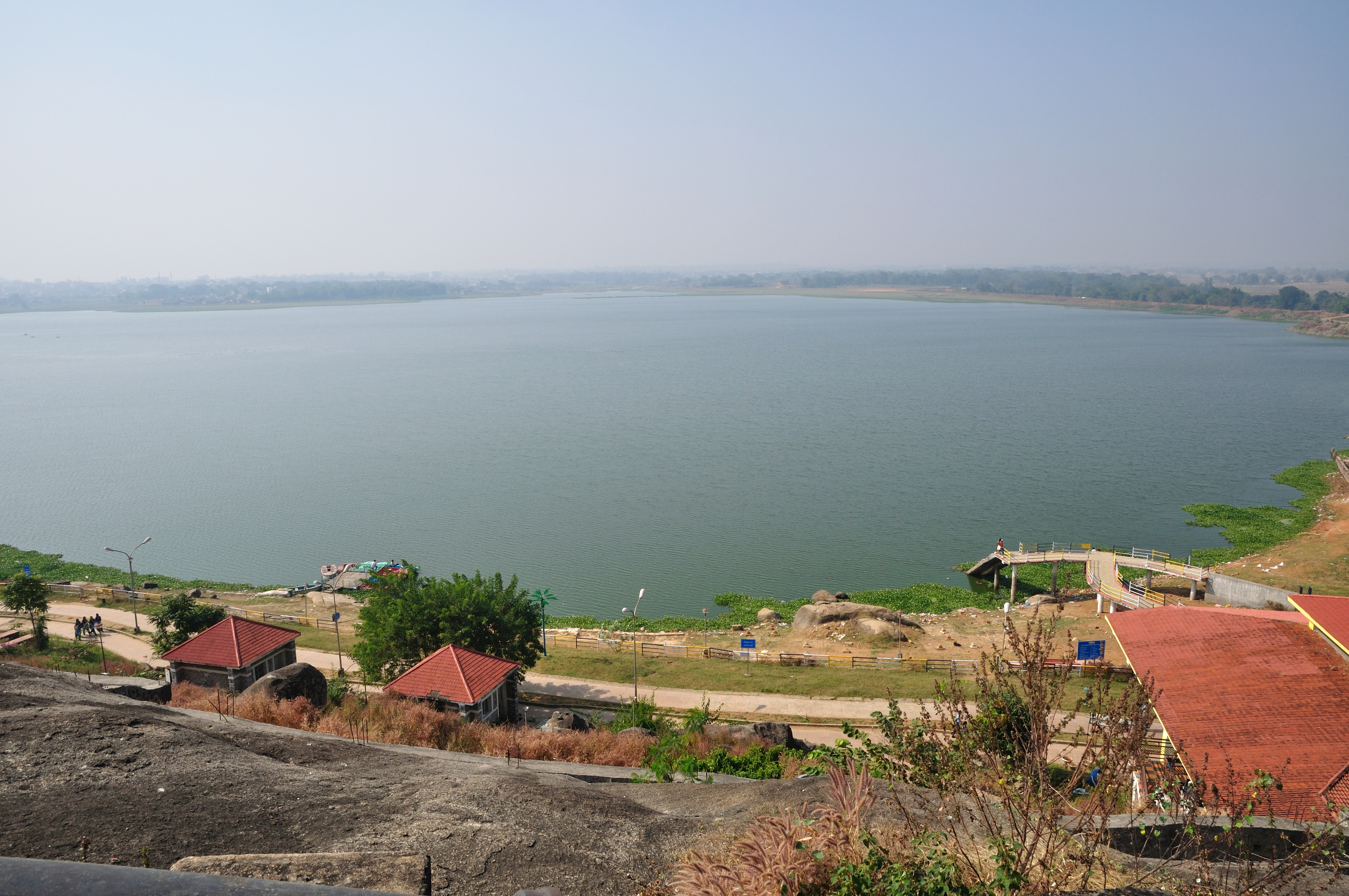

- Location within Jharkhand Location within India
- Coordinates: 23.43°N 85.32°E
- Country: India
- State: Jharkhand
- District: Ranchi

Government
  - Type: Federal democracy

Area
  - Total: 4.9 km^{2} (1.9 sq mi)
- Elevation: 611 m (2,005 ft)

Population (2011)
  - Total: 17,560
  - Density: 3,600/km^{2} (9,300/sq mi)

Languages (*For language details see Kanke block#Language and religion)
  - Official: Hindi, Urdu
- Time zone: UTC+5:30 (IST)
- PIN: 834006
- Telephone/STD code: 0651
- Vehicle registration: JH 1
- Literacy: 88.14%
- Lok Sabha constituency: Ranchi
- Vidhan Sabha constituency: Kanke
- Website: ranchi.nic.in

Kanke is a census town in the Kanke CD block in the Ranchi Sadar subdivision of Ranchi district in the Indian state of Jharkhand. Kanke has a large water reservoir called Kanke Dam, which is used to supply water to Ranchi city.

== Demographics ==
According to the 2011 Census of India, Kanke had a total population of 17,560, of which 9,166 (52%) were males and 8,394 (48%) were females. Population in the age range 0–6 years was 1,862. The total number of literate persons in Kanke was 13,837 (88.14% of the population over 6 years).

As of 2001 India census, Kanke had a population of 16,396. Males constitute 53% of the population and females 47%. Kanke has an average literacy rate of 75%, higher than the national average of 59.5%: male literacy is 80%, and female literacy is 70%. In Kanke, 11% of the population is under 6 years of age.

== Geography ==
Cities, towns and locations in Ranchi district in South Chotanagpur Division
M: municipality, CT: census town, R: rural/ urban centre, N: neighbourhood, T: tourist centre, D: dam, H: historical/ religious centre
Owing to space constraints in the small map, the actual locations in a larger map may vary slightly

=== Location ===
Kanke is located at 23.43°N 85.32°E. It has an average elevation of 611 metres (2004 feet).

=== Area overview ===
The map alongside shows a part of the Ranchi plateau, most of it at an average elevation of 2,140 feet above sea level. Only a small part in the north-eastern part of the district is the lower Ranchi plateau, spread over Silli, Rahe, Sonahatu and Tamar CD blocks, at an elevation of 500 to 1,000 feet above sea level. There is a 16 km long ridge south-west of Ranchi. There are isolated hills in the central plateau. The principal river of the district, the Subarnarekha, originates near Ratu, flows in an easterly direction and descends from the plateau, with a drop of about 300 feet at Hundru Falls. Subarnarekha and other important rivers are marked on the map. The forested area is shaded in the map. A major part of the North Karanpura Area and some fringe areas of the Piparwar Area of the Central Coalfields Limited, both located in the North Karanpura Coalfield, are in Ranchi district. There has been extensive industrial activity in Ranchi district, since independence. Ranchi district is the first in the state in terms of population. 8.83% of the total population of the state lives in this district - 56.9% is rural population and 43.1% is urban population. The Kanke LGA has an average temperature of 29 degrees Celsius and a total area of 926 square kilometers. In the LGA, the average humidity is 59%. The region has two different seasons: the dry season and the rainy season.

Note: The map alongside presents some of the notable locations in the district. All places marked in the map are linked in the larger full screen map.

== Education ==
One of the most prestigious Law Schools in the Country, National University of Study and Research in Law is located in Kanke. Additionally, Birsa Agricultural University, Institute for Coal Management, and few other institutions are located in Kanke.

== Healthcare ==
The Kanke Mental Asylum (one of the largest in India) and Central Institute of Psychiatry (formerly known as European Mental Hospital) was started by the British who thought that the cooler climate of Ranchi would be salubrious to mental health.

== Infrastructure ==
According to the District Census Handbook 2011, Ranchi, Kanke covered an area of 4.9 km^{2}. Among the civic amenities, it had 23 km roads with open drains, the protected water supply involved hand pump, tap water from treated source. It had 2,631 domestic electric connections, 12 road lighting points. Among the medical facilities, it had 3 hospitals, 2 dispensaries, 2 health centres, 1 family welfare centre, 10 maternity and child welfare centres, 10 maternity homes, 1 nursing home, 7 medicine shops. Among the educational facilities it had 12 primary schools, 11 middle schools, 7 secondary schools, 2 senior secondary schools, 1 general degree college. It had 1 non-formal educational centre (Sarva Siksha Abhiyan). Among the social, recreational and cultural facilities, it had 1 auditorium/ community hall. Three important commodities it produced were bakery items, furniture, leaf plates. It had the branch offices of 4 nationalised banks, 1 cooperative bank.
