= H. Narayan Murthy =

Indian psychologist (1924–2011)

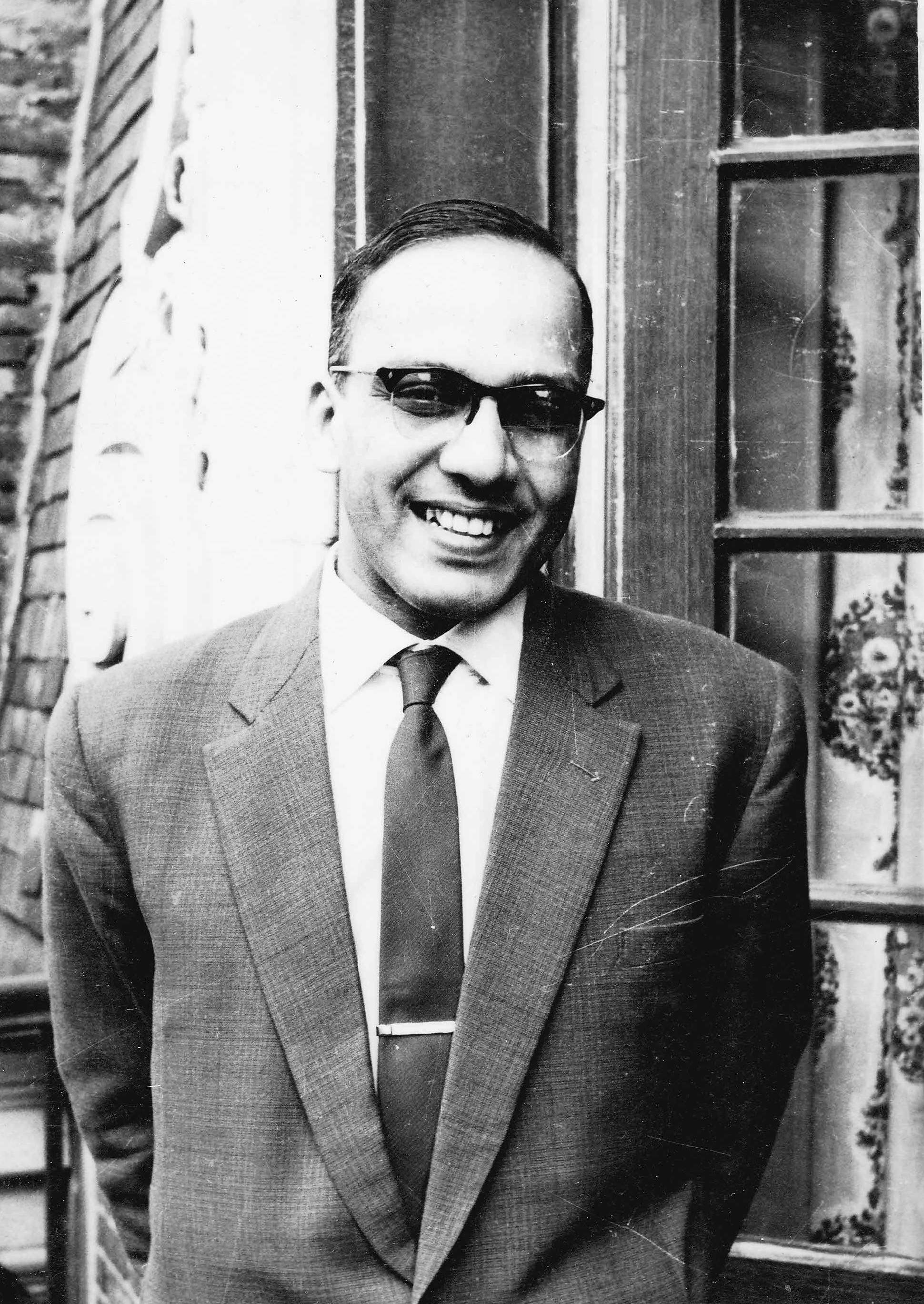
- Dr H. Narayan Murthy, Belgium, 1954
- Born: Hosur Narayan Murthy; 1924; Bangalore
- Died: 22 August 2011 (aged 87); Bangalore, India
- Education: University of Mysore, Katholieke Universiteit Leuven (Belgium)
- Known for: behavioral therapy
- Awards: "Bhabha Memorial Gold Medal" (Best scholar in Philosophy and Psychology)
- Scientific career
- Fields: Psychology, behavioral therapy, schizophrenia, depression
- Workplaces: Mysore State Mental Hospital, Ranchi European Lunatic Asylum, National Institute of Mental Health and Neuro-Sciences (NIMHANS)
- Thesis: Causality in Experimental Psychology
- Doctoral students: Dr Padma Murthy
- Other notable students: Dr Padma Murthy, Dr M.S. Thimmappa
- Website: H. Narayan Murthy

Hosur Narayan Murthy (H. N. Murthy) (Kannada: ಎಚ್. ಎನ್. ಮೂರ್ತಿ; 1924–2011) was an Indian clinical psychologist, writer, philosopher, Sanskrit scholar and teacher who headed the department of clinical psychology at National Institute of Mental Health and Neuro Sciences (NIMHANS) at Bangalore. He was born in the city of Bangalore in 1924 to Brahmin parents Hosur Ramaswamaiah Subba Rao and smt Rajamma. Murthy's father was an official at "Iron and Steel Plant" at Bhadravathi town in Karnataka.

== Education ==
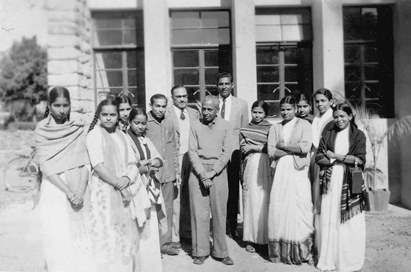
Murthy with his professor and colleagues

Murthy finished his basic schooling at Bhadravathi before coming to Mysore for his college education. While in Mysore, Murthy enrolled into the Maharaja's College, Mysore to pursue his bachelor's degree (B.A.) in psychology under the professorship of Dr M.V.Gopalaswamy. His dissertation for the bachelor's degree at Maharaja's College, Mysore was "National Stereotypes" – a comparative study of how Indians perceive foreigners and how foreigners perceive Indians (the stereotyped impressions of each other). On completion in 1952, Murthy was awarded the "Bhabha Memorial Gold Medal" for the best scholar in psychology and philosophy.

=== M.V.Gopalaswamy ===
Dr M.V.Gopalaswamy, mentor and professor to Murthy, was among the founding fathers of Department of Psychology at University of Mysore (1924). A student of Dr Charles Spearman under whom he secured his PhD in London, M.V.Gopalaswamy returned to India with a stand-alone transponder with which he started the first amateur radio station. He is credited with coining the term "Akashvani" for All India Radio., An avid reader and intellectual, Gopalaswamy's interests in "Tantra Philosophy" and "Modern Psychology" saw him spend hours with another distinguished historian at University of Mysore – S. Srikanta Sastri (shown together in photograph). Incidentally, Murthy happens to be S. Srikanta Sastri's nephew.

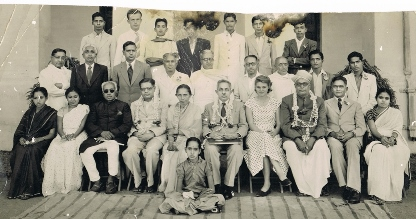
bottom row (sitting) L-R: 3rd-M.V.Gopalaswamy, 4th-S. Srikanta Sastri

Murthy would secure his master's degree (M.A.) in psychology under Dr M.V.Gopalaswamy in 1954 at University of Mysore whereafter he occupied positions at "Ranchi European Lunatic Asylum" and "Mysore State Mental Hospital" before pursuing a doctoral study abroad.

== Doctoral studies ==
After securing his master's degree in psychology from University of Mysore, Murthy gained admission into "Katholieke Universiteit Leuven" or the "Catholic University of Leuven", Belgium to pursue his doctoral studies in psychology for the award of a PhD.His subject chosen was "Causality in Experimental Psychology". In addition to the award of a PhD, the title of "Professor Excelsior" was conferred on Murthy. While in Europe, Murthy perfected the nuances of "Behavioural therapy" and would later work on adapting the same to Indian conditions back home. His keen interest in Manic Depressive Psychosis and Schizophrenia probably stemmed forth while at Leuven.

== Contributions ==
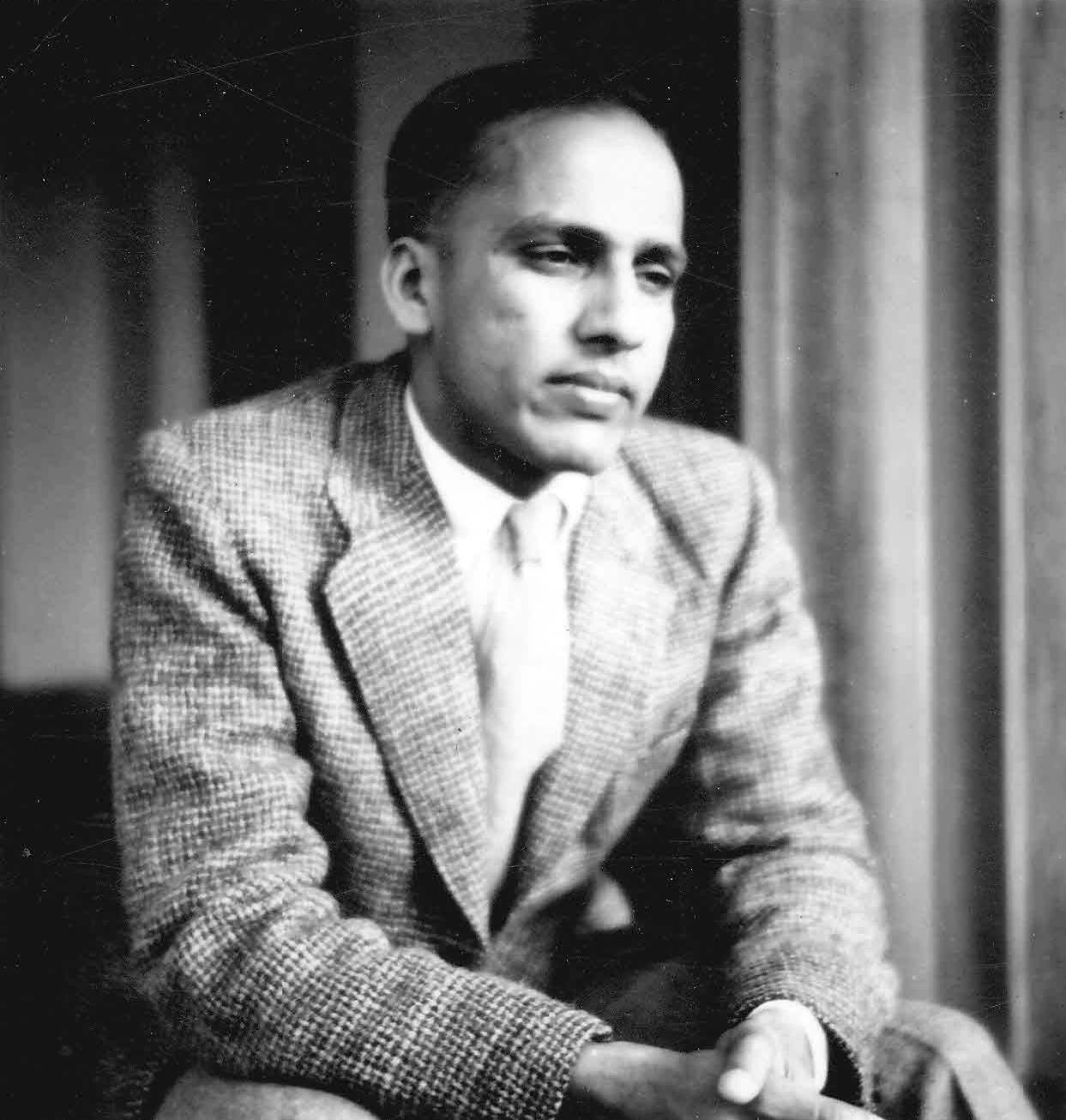
Murthy (at NIMHANS)

On his return to India from Belgium, Murthy joined National Institute of Mental Health and Neuro Sciences (NIMHANS), Bangalore where for the next two decades, he dedicated his efforts at introducing the concept of behavioural therapy in the Indian setting., He was responsible for the introduction of clinical neuropsychology and behavioural medicine to India, and developed a number of diagnostic scales for classifying mental disorders. A novel approach, Behavioural therapy was new to India in the early 1970s and under Murthy's guidance embodied a holistic approach towards the psychiatric patient, taking into account not only the patient, but also his family members in their efforts at effective counselling. The success of such an approach saw a decline in the admissions to the mental health facility for the first time in years. Murthy also drew up various questionnaires (Multiphasic Questionnaires) to better assess and quantify the psychological state of the patient and many of these are still in vogue. Some of the diagnostic scales incorporated in the "Multiphasic Personality Questionnaire" formulated by Murthy are shown here:

- Depressive Scale
- Paranoid Scale
- Schizophrenia Scale
- Manic Scale
- Depressive Anxiety Scale
- Hysteria Scale
- K Scale

His work on "The relation of cyclothymia-schizothymia to extroversion-introversion" is significant and finds place in the Kyoto University Psychology Department syllabus. His contribution towards "Organic Brain Dysfunction" is acknowledged in an article concerning "battery of tests to detect organic brain dysfunction" which appeared in the January issue of Journal of Clinical Psychology. Another, somewhat controversial yet intriguing aspect which Murthy took time to examine were the claims of reincarnation while in a psychotic state. A brief report of the same appeared in the September 1978 issue of Indian Journal of Clinical Psychology. His comparative study of "suicides" with "attempted suicides" in women was published in 1983 in Indian Journal of Psychological Medicine and assumed significance in the Asian setting against the backdrop of newer economic realities. Dr H.N.Murthy aided a treatise examining the etiology (Nidana) of Mental diseases in Ayurveda and was successful in bridging allopathic medicine and its integral concepts to the age old system of Indian Medicine ("Apasmara"-Epilepsy). A comparison of "Yogis" and "Control subjects" with regard to their voluntary control of personality traits and psychological adjustment patterns appeared in the Indian Journal of Physiology and Pharmacology in 1987 and was a turning point in the scientific analysis of yogic claims of self-control of personality and self actuation.

== Legacy ==
Murthy remained a bachelor. His legacy today stems from the scores of students who got trained under him. Murthy is best remembered for guiding a doctoral work on "Psychology in Music" by Dr Padma Murthy. His other student Dr M.S.Thimmappa would later occupy the chair of Vice Chancellor of Bangalore University. His personal library with a collection of books exceeding thousands was his treasured possession. Deeply spiritual and philosophical, he was an ardent devotee and follower of the "Ramakrishna Mutt". Murthy died on 22 August 2011 aged 87 years at Bangalore. In his memory, "Dr H.N.Murthy Oration" is arranged every year by the "Indian Journal of Clinical Psychology" where budding psychologists from the fraternity deliver papers in his honour in subjects concerning behavioral medicine and bio-feedback. On Murthy's death, his student Dr M.S.Thimmappa (ex-vice chancellor of Bangalore University) dedicated a tribute to his mentor, excerpts of which are shown here:

Dr. H. N. Murthy was a man of great character with unrelenting resolve and firm determination in his pursuit. He remained a bachelor, had deep philosophical interest, ever eager to see or make fresh interpretation of our ancient scriptures in tune with modern scientific discoveries, which we had umpteen number of occasions to discuss forgetting time and space, in and outside the classroom. We were drawn so close together, hours of debate on vexing topic done with such cordial, intimate and intense manner as equal friends than teacher-student relationship would enjoin.
