= Indian Journal of Psychological Medicine =

- Discipline: Psychiatry
- Language: English
- Edited by: Rajshekhar Bipeta

Publication details
- History: 1978–present
- Publisher: Sage Publishing on behalf of the Indian Psychiatric Society, South Zonal Branch (India)
- Frequency: Bimonthly
- Open access: Yes
- Impact factor: 1.9 (2023)

Standard abbreviations
- ISO 4: Indian J. Psychol. Med.

Indexing
- ISSN: 0253-7176 (print); 0975-1564 (web)
- OCLC no.: 320303467

Links
- Journal homepage; Online access; Online archive

The Indian Journal of Psychological Medicine is a peer-reviewed open access medical journal published bimonthly by Sage Publishing on behalf of the Indian Psychiatric Society, South Zonal Branch. It covers all aspects of psychiatry and was established in 1978. It is edited by Rajshekhar Bipeta.

== Abstracting and indexing ==
The journal is abstracted and indexed in:

- Scopus
- Emerging Sources Citation Index
- EBSCO databases
- ProQuest databases
