= Central Institute of Psychiatry =

Kanke, India

- Former name: Ranchi European Lunatic Asylum
- Type: Public Medical School
- Established: May 17, 1918; 108 years ago
- Parent institution: Ministry of Health and Family Welfare, Government of India
- Affiliations: National Medical Commission
- Academic affiliations: Ranchi University
- Director: Dr. Vijai Kumar Chaudhary
- Students: Totals: MD – 27+7 (EWS quota seats); MPhill – 30; PhD – 4
- Location: Kanke, Ranchi, Jharkhand, India; 23.4346°N 85.3258°E
- Campus: Urban 211 acres (0.85 km^{2})
- Website: cipranchi.nic.in

The Central Institute of Psychiatry Ranchi (CIP Ranchi) is an institute that is directly governed by the Government of India. It is situated in Kanke, Ranchi in Jharkhand state of India.

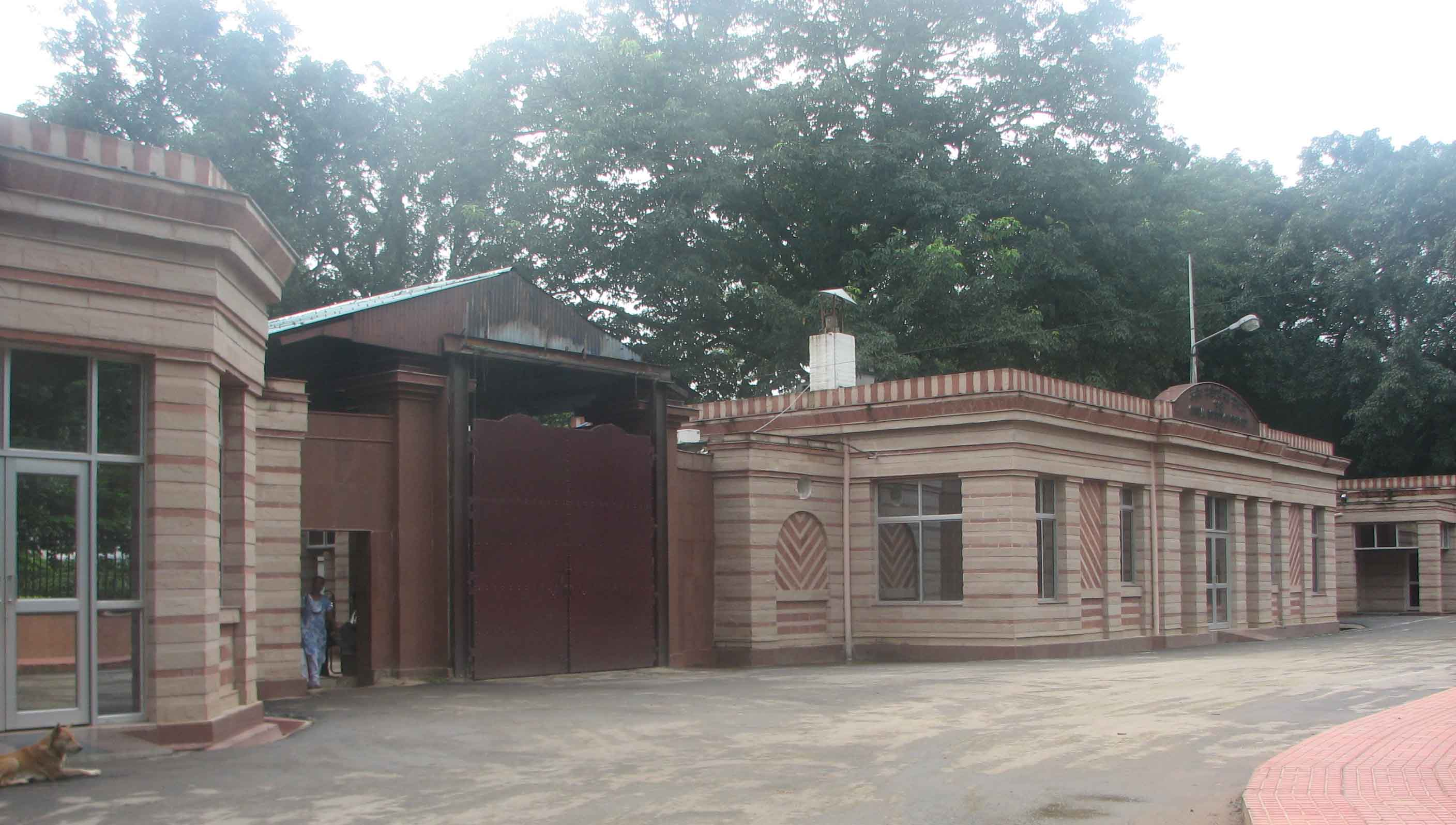
CIP, Ranchi

== History ==
The institute dates back to the days of the British Raj in India. The British established this hospital on 17 May 1918 with the name of 'Ranchi European Lunatic Asylum'. It had then a capacity of 174 patients (92 males and 82 females). It catered to the needs of the European mental patients only and it was under the direct control and management of Government of Bihar (then, Jharkhand was a part of Bihar).

In 1922, it was put under the control of a board of trustees with various participating state governments represented in the Board and in the very same year its name was changed to 'European Mental Hospital'. The year 1922 is also notable for the fact that the institute was affiliated to the University of London for the Diploma in Psychological Medicine examination. It was a unique phenomenon since the postgraduate training in Psychiatry was nonexistent in India in those days.

On May 17 2017, the then Governor Droupadi Murmu emphasized the critical need to elevate the Central Institute of Psychiatry (CIP) in Ranchi to the status of an Institute of National Importance is a significant step towards addressing the mental health crisis in India. It highlights the need for dedicated resources and attention to mental health, ensuring that institutions like CIP can continue to serve as beacons of hope and healing.

== Timeline ==
- The first Occupational Therapy Department in 1922
- ECT in 1943
- Psychosurgery and Neurosurgery in 1947
- Clinical psychology and Electroencephalography (EEG) departments in 1948
- a full-fledged neuropathology section in 1952
- the first use of Lithium in 1952 and chlorpromazine in 1953
- A very modern radiology department with facility for sophisticated cerebral angiography, pneumoencephalography, air ventriculography, myelography etc. was established in 1954
- Child guidance clinic in 1950
- Rural mental health clinic at Mander in 1967
- rehabilitation centre and sheltered workshop in 1967, and
- industrial psychiatry unit at HEC, Ranchi in 1973.

== Indian Psychiatric Society ==
The Indian Psychiatric Society was established in 1948 because of the efforts of this Institute and it is registered in Patna. The first draft of the Bill that subsequently became the Mental Health Act of India (1987) was written at CIP Ranchi in 1949 by Dr. R. B. Davis, the then Medical Superintendent, Dr. S. A. Hasib from Indian Mental Hospital, Ranchi and Dr. J. Roy, from Mental Hospital, Gwalior. The latter two too had worked at CIP Ranchi at one time or other.

== Hospital ==
The hospital is spread over 210 acres of lush green campus. There are 16 wards – nine for male patients, six for female patients and a Family Unit. CIP ranchi is the largest psychiatric hospital in whole Asia. They have a total bed capacity of 643. Each ward is of pavilion type and has well laid out roads and lawns around it. The wards were built during the British Raj, and are named after eminent European psychiatrists and physicians. The wards are at some distance from each other, and the male and female sections are separated by a high wall. Unlike other mental hospitals, CIP, Ranchi has never been a custodial care facility. It has always been an open hospital and the patients are never confined to rooms. They are free to roam within the boundary wall of the hospital.

Every year, around 3,000 patients are admitted and discharged after treatment. Individualized patient care is a regular practice in the hospital. Besides pharmacotherapy, electroconvulsive therapy, psychotherapies and family interventions are routinely employed. A milieu therapy approach exists where patients participate in running the ward and help in looking after other patients. Regular physical exercise, outdoor and indoor games and yoga are on hand for the patients. A library with books in English, Hindi, Urdu and Bengali as well as a number of newspapers and magazines is freely accessible to the patients.

== Medical training ==
Central Institute of Psychiatry is one of the premier training centers in India for mental health professionals. The erstwhile Hospital for Mental Diseases was recognized for D.P.M. of England in as far back as 1923, when postgraduate courses in Psychiatry were unheard of in India. In 1962, a postgraduate training centre was added to the institute, with D.P.M. and D.M. & S.P. courses. Other courses were added in due course of time, and currently the following postgraduate course in psychiatry and behavioral sciences are conducted at the Institute:

- M.D. (Psychiatry)
- Diploma in Psychological Medicine
- Ph.D. in Clinical Psychology
- M.Phil. in Medical & Social Psychology/M.Phil Clinical Psychology (2012 onward)
- M.Phil. in Psychiatric Social Work
- Diploma in Psychiatric Nursing

The institute is affiliated to Ranchi University. Admission to the various courses is through open advertisement in all the leading newspapers. The candidates are selected for admission by a Selection Committee constituted by the Director General of health Services, New Delhi.

== Controversy and criticisms ==
=== 2013 student strike ===
MPhil and PhD students of Central Institute of Psychiatry (CIP) went on an indefinite dharna demanding immediate recognition of the courses by Rehabilitation Council of India (RCI). RCI had de-recognised the programmes in 2009 for not having adequate number of Professors. Other courses also lacked qualified staff, which raised serious concerns about the quality of Mental Health Professional Training. The pioneer institute in mental health has not had a qualified permanent professor in Department of Clinical Psychology and Department of social work since last 20 years. The other factors which bought about the strike were discrimination, harassment and exploitation of the students. CIP neglected the Ranchi High Court Verdict-2008 to appoint professors in various departments.

=== Mass breakout of patients ===
In September 1984, the Press Trust of India reported that 460 patients out of over a thousand patients in CIP had escaped from the premises. They were able to do so because all the staff had gone on strike, due to low pay. Even after a week had passed, close to 100 patients were still missing and still had to be located. After the incident, The Times of India reported the poor conditions of the hospital. It said that many of the patients were half-starved and in poor health, had skin diseases and diarrhea. It also alleged that the two meals served daily reeked of urine. The Times also stated in a later report that the medical superintendent of the hospital, Durga Bhagal, was charged by the state government of incompetence and mismanagement. Bhagal denied that there was unusually higher mortality rates within the hospital. The absconding patients who poured into the streets chanted "Save Us!". The deputy hospital superintendent stated that there have been 131 deaths in the hospital in the previous year, on the year of the incident, at least 151 patients died. The deputy superintendent also stated these deaths were caused by the lack of funds for provisioning basic necessities such as food. A member of the West Bengal Psychiatric Association commented that there was a huge shortage of beds in mental health care. This mass break out of patients occurred in RINPAS which is under the state government. CIP never had any such mass escape. Bhagal never worked in CIP as a superintendent. He held that post in RINPAS

=== Detention of Chinese prisoner of war ===
In August 2000, the AFP picked up news by the South China Sunday Morning Post which reported that two chinese military officers from the Sino-Indian War in 1962, were there held since 1965, after they were charged of espionage. The Indian Home Affairs Minister said that he was not aware of the detention. The individuals were Yang Chen, a fighter pilot and Shih Liang, a flight officer. The CIP staff claimed after their recovery from schizophrenia these two individuals remained there because they had nowhere to go.

The Daily Telegraph, London then reported that these two individuals would be returned to China after 35 years of negligence from both the Chinese Embassy and the Indian Home Ministry.

The two individuals, as per the account of Dr. Nizamie, were civilians who has crossed over inadvertently as a consequence of their psychosis.

=== Patient suicides ===
In August 2005, The Telegraph reported that at least three individuals from the beginning of the year had committed suicide while being admitted. Unnamed sources from CIP told the newspaper that there was a severe manpower shortage within the hospital. It said that the patient:staff ratio in CIP was 40:1 compared to the recommended 5:1. The allegation of understaffing was refuted by the director of CIP, S. Haque Nizami.

== Helpline ==
The CIP also operates a helpline number, which commenced operations from November 2011. It provides counselling to depressed individuals.

== Eminent faculty ==
- H. Narayan Murthy – Renowned Clinical Psychologist, Philosopher and Pioneer of Behavioural Therapy in India
- Professor Nandini Chakraborty - Consultant Psychiatrist of early intervention in psychosis at Leicester Partnership NHS Trust, UK

== See also ==
- Ministry of Health and Family Welfare
- Central Health Service (CHS)
