= Prerna Kohli =

Indian clinical psychologist (born 1965)

Dr. Prerna Kohli
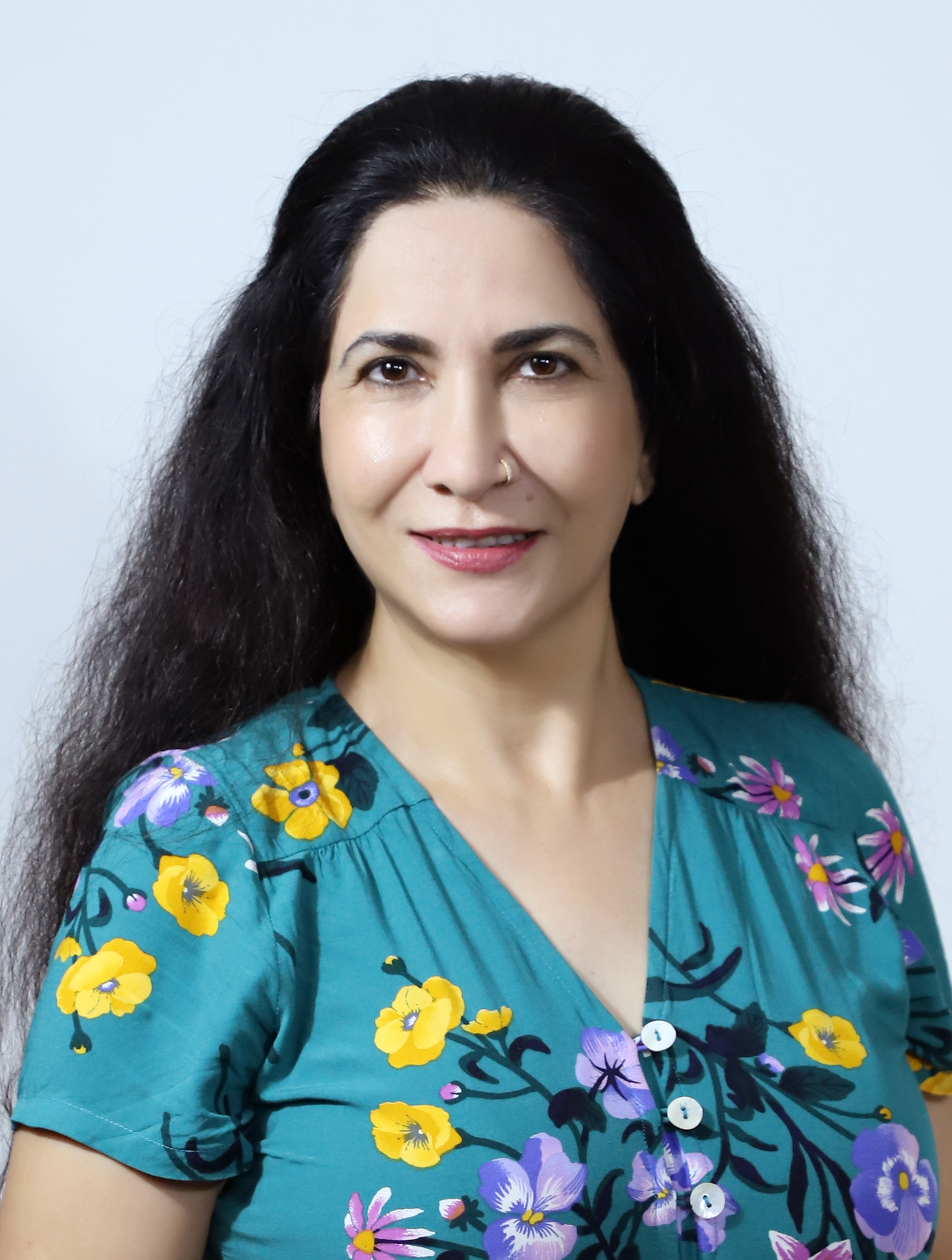
- Born: 21 December 1965 (age 60); Aligarh, Uttar Pradesh, India
- Education: Aligarh Muslim University (AMU)
- Occupations: Clinical psychologist Social worker
- Website: www.drprernakohli.in

Prerna Kohli is a clinical psychologist, social worker and author. She was awarded the ‘100 Women Achievers of India’ in 2016 by the President of India for her work on mental health.

== Career ==
Kohli completed Ph.D. in clinical psychology from Aligarh Muslim University (AMU) and began her practice in 1994 from Gurugram. Kohli has advised various Government committees like the Press Information Bureau of India and the National Commission for Protection of Child Rights.

Kohli is the author of a book on mental health called Psychologist Musings. She has helped the prison inmates and the prison officers of Tihar Jail and Aligarh Jail to overcome mental health problems.

In January 2016, she got felicitated by the President of India, Pranab Mukherjee, as one of the top 100 Women Achievers of the country.

== See also ==
- Radhika Chandiramani
- Indira Sharma
- Bhargavi Davar
