= Iced =

Iced may refer to:

- Iced (film), a 1988 American slasher film
- Iced, a 1993 novel by American author and actor Ray Shell
- "Iced" (CSI), a television episode
- Iced (toolkit), a cross-platform GUI toolkit for Rust
- Iced!, a 2008 immigration-simulation video game

== See also ==
- Freezing
- Ice
- Ice (disambiguation)
- Icing (disambiguation)
