= Bell Bajao =

Anti-domestic violence campaign in India

Bell Bajao Campaign by Breakthrough
- Founder: Mallika Dutt
- Type: Community Service
- Purpose: Domestic Violence
- Location: India, United States
- Website: https://www.bellbajao.org/

Bell Bajao (Hindi for 'ring the bell') is an anti-domestic violence campaign in India. It urges local residents to take a stand against physical abuse through acts meant to interrupt domestic violence. Residents, specifically men, are urged to "ring the doorbell" and ask a simple question when they overhear violence against a woman taking place, such as to borrow some tea, to use the phone, or to have a glass of water. This is meant to let the abuser know that others can hear them and will act to interrupt the violence.

The campaign was launched in India on 20 August, 2008, by Breakthrough in collaboration with the Ministry of Women and Child Development, UNIFEM, and the UN Trust Fund. The global campaign, known in English as "Ring The Bell," was launched at the Clinton Global Initiative. United Nations Secretary General Ban Ki-moon joined the campaign as the inaugural global "champion," and Breakthrough will join forces with his UNiTE to End Violence Against Women campaign as its first global partner.

This campaign promotes individual action against domestic violence. The campaign featured award-winning Public Service Announcements, as well as media and training tools. The campaign targets boys and men and calls on them to intervene if they witness domestic violence. A key aspect of the campaign was thinking of men as partners in ending domestic violence, instead of only as violators. The PSAs reached over 130 million people. Like the "Is This Justice?" campaign, this campaign was produced pro bono by the advertising agency Ogilvy and Mather and directed by Bauddhayan Mukherji of Little Lamb Films.

== Breakthrough ==
Breakthrough is an international human rights organization using the power of popular culture, media, and community mobilization to transform public attitudes and advance equality, justice, and dignity. "Restore Fairness" (urges the U.S. government to restore due process to the US immigration system), "Is this justice" (about domestic violence), and "What kind of man are you" (about HIV/AIDS and condom usage) are other initiatives in the United States. Most recently, Breakthrough created America 2049, a Facebook game set in a dystopic alternative future that deals with issues of immigration, sex trafficking, and labor rights. Breakthrough addresses critical global issues including violence against women, sexuality and HIV/AIDS, racial justice, and immigrant rights.

The Bell Bajao! campaign, rolled out by the organization in 2008, was a serious call to end domestic violence. With the help of television, radio, and print ads in addition to community awareness programs across India, Bell Bajao! has reached more than 130 million people. The campaigns also featured a mobile video van that travelled to three states in India-Karnataka, Maharashtra, and Uttar Pradesh in addition to six advertisements that were aired on all major television channels. Mobile van activity was supported by interviews and views from leading personalities and celebrities for the ‘Bell Bajao-Champion Voices’ initiative. Also, the champions were eminent figures from various walks of life who are seen as inspiring models who can drive change in society. The video van activities helped to reach out to 5.5 million people in four districts of Karnataka. The campaign majorly targeted men and boys and engaged them to play a more pro-active role in preventing domestic violence, and the awareness and intervention campaign, which was funded by UN Women and implemented by Breakthrough Trust.

The video van promoted helpline numbers 103 and 1298 and employed different activities and advertisement methods. The campaign also won an award in the Film Lions category of the Cannes Advertising Festival for the advertisement titled "The Bus Driver," which was based on a real-life incident in the Aurangabad district of Maharashtra, where a bus driver refused to play a passive role as a woman was beaten up by her husband.

In addition to the above initiatives, around 23 workshops and public education activities were conducted with 575 staff and members of the NGO, CBO, and the positive people’s network in Karnataka and Uttar Pradesh to enhance their understanding of the issue.

== Focus ==
Breakthrough believes that every person in this world is entitled to a fundamental set of human rights that allow him or her to live with dignity and self-respect. They believe that women have often been regarded as less than human and, therefore, not entitled to these human rights. Breakthrough attempts to change attitudes towards women. One key example is the Breakthrough Mann Ke Manjeere music video, which shows a woman’s celebration of self-discovery and the ability to make choices in life. The Bell Bajao! campaign attempts to bring attention to domestic violence through a powerful series of PSAs that focus attention on this issue.

== Creating awareness ==
Breakthrough uses innovative tools to engage youth and create a culture of human rights. Here are a few ways that Breakthrough spreads the Bell Bajao! message throughout the country:

- Celebrity involvement: the actor Boman Irani, who is the brand ambassador for this campaign, weaves men into the initiative, saying that men can stop domestic violence by becoming sensitized and involved in the issue.
- Television, radio, and press: 32 million people have seen and heard the message of Bell Bajao. Through television, radio, and press. Television advertisements depict men and boys who hear domestic violence and take a minute out of their everyday lives to intervene and stop the violence.
- Video Vans: mobile vans have been on the road for 150 days, traveling 80,000 kilometers across 6 districts in Uttar Pradesh, Karnataka, and Maharashtra, and have exposed 2.7 million people to this burning issue. Innovative and interactive, the van built audience participation through games, street theater, audiovisual tools, and quizzes.
- Interactive, dedicated website: breakthrough’s ground-breaking blog on www.bellbajao.org provides a platform– previously nonexistent in India– for dialogue about domestic violence. To date, witnesses, victims, and advocates have all had an open space for personal testimony and reflection.
- Leadership Training: The Rights Advocates program embodies on-the-ground youth and community leadership training to reaffirm the message of Bell Bajao! and help Indian youth recognize and fight domestic violence in their own communities. The training develops the capacity and life skills of the trainees in a variety of complex areas, like human rights, gender-based violence, and reproductive health. In 2008, the program trained over 100,000 people and aims to double its reach in 2009.

== Awards and recognition ==
1. Silver Lion, Cannes Film Festival (Bell Bajao), 2010
2. Silver at the London International Advertising Awards 2010
3. Official Selection, Festival Du Cannes, Short Film Corner 2010
4. Gold and Silver at Goafest, (Bell Bajao), 2009
5. Gold at Spikes Asia 2010
6. Gold at Spikes Asia 2009
7. One Show Merit 2009
8. One Show Merit 2010
9. Young Achiever's Award from Advertising Club of Bombay (Bell Bajao), (O & M's Ryan Mendonca), 2009
10. Best Integrated Campaign of the Year, Creative Abby Awards at Goafest for Public Service, Appeals and Charity (Bell Bajao), 2009
11. Laadli Awards (Little Lamb Film's Bauddhayan Mukherji) 2010
12. Manthan award in 2011, started by the Digital Empowerment Foundation
