= Antapur Venkoba Rao =

Indian psychiatrist (1927-2005)

Antapur Venkoba Rao M.D. Ph.D. D.Sc. FAMS FASc
- Born: 20 August 1927; Kavuttalam, Andhra Pradesh
- Died: 25 September 2005 (aged 78)
- Other name: A. Venkoba Rao
- Education: Madras Medical College; NIMHANS; Madras University
- Occupations: Psychiatrist, Educator, Researcher
- Organizations: Indian Psychiatric Society; Indian Association of Social Psychiatrists (Founder)
- Notable work: Psychiatry of Old Age in India
- Awards: Dr. B. C. Roy National Award 1981; Sir Shri Ram Oration Award 1983; Sandoz Oration Award 1984

Antapur Venkoba Rao (20 August 1927 – 25 September 2005), also known as A. Venkoba Rao, was an Indian psychiatrist. His career spanned several decades, during which he made contributions to psychiatric research, education, and clinical practice in India. He served as Professor and Head of the Department of Psychiatry at Madurai Medical College from 1962 to 1985, founded the Indian Association of Social Psychiatrists, and was the Editor-in-Chief of the Indian Journal of Psychiatry.

== Early life ==
Venkoba Rao was born on 20 August 1927 in Kavuttalam, Andhra Pradesh, to A. Raghavendra Rao and Lakshmi Devi. The eldest of eight siblings, he completed his schooling at Municipal High School, Bellary, and later graduated with first-class distinction in natural sciences from Ceded District College, Anantapur. He pursued his MBBS at Madras Medical College, where he trained under pediatrician S.T. Achar. He earned an M.D. in General Medicine and a D.P.M. in Psychiatry from National Institute of Mental Health and Neurosciences, Bangalore, and later obtained a Ph.D. and D.Sc. from Madras University.

== Career ==
Rao began his psychiatric career at the Madras Mental Hospital, Kilpauk in 1954. He later worked as an assistant professor of psychiatry at Stanley Medical College and Madras Medical College. In 1962, he became the Professor and Head of the Department of Psychiatry at Madurai Medical College, a role he held until 1985. After retirement, he served as Emeritus Professor of Psychiatry at the same institution. In 1984, he founded the Indian Association of Social Psychiatrists and served as the president of the association between 1984 and 1986. From 1985 to 1992, he was the Officer-in-Charge of the ICMR Centre for Advanced Research on Health and Behaviour at Rajaji Government Hospital, Madurai. In 1986, he served as a visiting scientist at the National Institute of Mental Health in Bethesda, USA. He also presided over the Association of Gerontology (1991 –1992).

Rao also held key editorial roles, serving as Editor-in-Chief of the Indian Journal of Psychiatry (1968–1976) and contributing to several other journals, including Social Psychiatry and Transcultural Psychiatric Review. He authored over 400 research papers and books, including Psychiatry of Old Age in India, which focused on geriatric mental health. Venkoba Rao served as a WHO Consultant in 1980 and participated in the National Committee to Study Addiction in India.

== Awards ==
=== National Awards ===
- Dr. B. C. Roy National Award (1981) – Awarded by the Medical Council of India.
- Sir Shri Ram Oration Award (1983) – Awarded by the National Academy of Medical Sciences.

=== International Awards ===
- Sandoz Oration Award (1984) – From the University of Edinburgh.
- International Research Award – From the American Psychiatric Association (RIM Pacific).

=== Indian Council of Medical Research Awards ===
- Dr. P. N. Raju Oration Award (1975) – For research on "Suicidal Behaviour and Depression".
- Dr. M. N. Sen Oration Award – For work on "Depressive Illness".
- M. K. Seshadri Prize and Gold Medal (1987).

=== Indian Psychiatric Society Awards ===
- Dr. J. C. Marfatia Award (1972, 1973, 1979) – For the best papers presented at annual conferences.
- Sandoz Award (1972) – For the best paper published that year.
- Dr. D. L. N. Murthy Rao Award (1980).

=== Other Recognitions ===
- Dr. B. Ramamurthi Gold Medal and Oration Award (1984) – From the Indian Medical Association, Trichy.
- May and Baker Oration Award (1990) – From the Geriatric Society of India.
- Dr. N. N. De Oration Award (1991) - From the Indian Association for Social Psychiatry.
- Academy of Medical Practitioners' Award (1989–1990).

== Fellowships ==
=== Prestigious Fellowships ===
- Fellow, Royal College of Psychiatrists, London (1972).
- Fellow, National Academy of Medical Sciences (1975).
- Fellow, Indian Academy of Sciences (1984).
- Fellow, Indian National Science Academy (1989).

=== International Affiliations ===
- Fellow, American Psychiatric Association.
- Fellow, Canadian Association of Psychiatrists.
- Corresponding Member, Royal Australian and New Zealand College of Psychiatrists (1975).
- Fellow, Association of Psychiatrists, Africa (1972).

== Death ==
Venkoba Rao died on 25 September 2005 after a brief illness.
