= Dorchen Leidholdt =

American author and activist

- Born: Dorchen A. Leidholdt
- Education: Randolph College; University of Virginia; New York University School of Law (JD)
- Occupations: Author; activist
- Years active: Mid-1970s–present
- Movement: Feminism; Anti-pornography feminism; Anti-prostitution feminism

Dorchen A. Leidholdt is an American feminist activist and lawyer. From 1979 to 1983 she was a leader and spokesperson for Women Against Pornography, and in 1988 she helped found the Coalition Against Trafficking in Women, an international non-governmental organization that campaigns against prostitution and sex trafficking. Since 1994 she has directed the Center for Battered Women's Legal Services at Sanctuary for Families, a legal services program for domestic violence victims in New York City. She has also taught domestic violence law at Columbia University School of Law.

== Education ==
Leidholdt holds a master's degree from the University of Virginia, and a JD degree from New York University School of Law, where she was a Root-Tilden-Snow scholar.

== Career ==
From 1979 through 1983, she served as a leader and spokesperson for WAP, during which time she joined Gloria Steinem and other feminist leaders in initiating a suit against Hustler and Larry Flynt, appeared on numerous television and radio programs, organized educational events, and spoke in Washington D.C. before the U.S. Attorney General's Commission on Pornography (a.k.a. The Meese Commission) at the commission's invitation.

Flynt published an attack on her in the magazine's "Asshole of the Month" column (July 1985).

Leidholdt is the Director of the Center for Battered Women's Legal Services at Sanctuary for Families in New York City. Under Leidholdt's leadership since 1994, the center has become the largest legal services program for domestic violence victims in the country. It has grown from two to twenty-four lawyers and eight support staff members, and has strengthened its advocacy efforts on behalf of under-served populations of women, especially those in New York City's immigrant communities. The center has spearheaded state litigation that set new legal precedent expanding the protections available to domestic violence victims petitioning for orders of protection and federal litigation preventing child protective agencies from charging battered mothers with "engaging in domestic violence".

Leidholdt also serves as a board member of the Coalition Against Trafficking in Women (CATW), which she helped found in 1988. She has represented the Coalition at numerous international meetings, including the World Conference on Human Rights (Vienna, 1993) and the Fourth World Conference on Women (Beijing, 1995). On December 6, 1996, in a special session commemorating the abolition of slavery, Leidholdt and a survivor of sex trafficking together addressed the General Assembly of the United Nations.

Leidholdt has taught Criminal Procedure at City University School of Law, and, since 1998, has taught Domestic Violence and the Law at Columbia University School of Law.

== Activism ==
In 1990, Leidholdt became an associate of the Women's Institute for Freedom of the Press (WIFP).

== Awards and honors ==
- United Nations Capitol Association Human Rights Award (1994),
- The New York City Bar Association's Legal Services Award (1999)
- The Korean-American Family Service Center's Recognition Award (1999)
- The City of New York Award for "outstanding leadership in breaking the cycle of domestic violence" (1999)
- New York University School of Law Public Interest Law Foundation Award for "outstanding contributions in public interest law" (2000)
- The Lawyers Committee Against Domestic Violence "In the Trenches" Award (2000)
- The "Women of Power and Influence" Award by the National Organization for Women—New York City Chapter (2002)
- League of Women Voters of the City of New York "Woman of Distinction" Award (2007)
- New York State Coalition Against Domestic Violence, "30 Years 30 Leaders" Award (2008)
- New York University Law School Alumna of the Month Award (February 2008)

== Selected publications ==
=== Books ===
- Leidholdt, Dorchen; Raymond, Janice, eds. (1990). The sexual liberals and the attack on feminism. New York: Pergamon Press. ISBN 9780807762394.

Essays which originated as speeches and panel presentations at a conference on April 6, 1987, at the New York University Law School

- Leidholdt, Dorchen; Goodman, Jill Laurie, eds. (1998). Lawyer's manual on domestic violence: representing the victim (PDF) (5th ed.). New York: Appellate Division, First Department, Supreme Court of the State of New York. OCLC 137237540. Archived from the original (PDF) on February 25, 2018.
- Leidholdt, Dorchen; Goodman, Jill Laurie, eds. (2011). Lawyer's manual on human trafficking: pursuing justice for victims (PDF). New York: Supreme Court of the State of New York, Appellate Division, First Department, New York State Judicial Committee on Women in the Courts. OCLC 889004609.

=== Book chapters ===
- Leidholdt, Dorchen (1995). "Pornography in the workplace: sexual harassment litigation under title VII". In Lederer, Laura; Delgado, Richard (eds.). The price we pay: the case against racist speech, hate propaganda, and pornography. US / Canada: Hill and Wang / Harper Collins. ISBN 9780809015771.
- Leidholdt, Dorchen (1995). "Trafficking in women in Europe". In Lederer, Laura (ed.). Sexual politics and the European Union: the new feminist challenge. Providence, Rhode Island: Berghahn. ISBN 9781571810465.
- Leidholdt, Dorchen (1998). "Interviewing battered women". In Cohen, Ronald E.; Neely, James C. (eds.). Lawyer's manual on domestic violence: representing the victim. New York: Appellate Division, First Department, Supreme Court of the State of New York. OCLC 40115035.
- Leidholdt, Dorchen (1998). "From sex trafficking to FGM: emerging issues confronting advocates for battered immigrant women". In Leidholdt, Dorchen; Goodman, Jill Laurie (eds.). Lawyer's manual on domestic violence: representing the victim (PDF) (5th ed.). New York: Appellate Division, First Department, Supreme Court of the State of New York. OCLC 137237540. Archived from the original (PDF) on February 25, 2018.

=== Journal articles ===
- Leidholdt, Dorchen (1993). "Prostitution: a violation of women's human rights". Cardozo Women's Law Journal. 1 (1): 133–147. Pdf.
- Leidholdt, Dorchen (January 1994). "Pimping and Prostitution as Sexual Harassment: Amicus Brief on behalf of the New York State Women's Bar Association and the National Coalition Against Sexual Assault in Dilorenzo v. Guccione". Michigan Journal of Gender and Law.

See also: Anneka diLorenzo, Respondent, v. Penthouse International, Ltd., et al., Appellants

- Leidholdt, Dorchen (January 2004). "Prostitution and trafficking in women". Journal of Trauma Practice. 2 (3–4): 167–183. doi:10.1300/J189v02n03_09. S2CID 44530084.

== Notable court cases ==
- Dorchen Leidholdt vs. Hustler Magazine, 647 F. Supp. 1283 (D. Wyo. 1986)
- Dorchen Leidholdt vs. Larry Flynt, 860 F.2d 890 (9th Cir. 1988)

== See also ==
- Feminist views on pornography
