= Sakhi for South Asian Women =

Anti-domestic violence organization

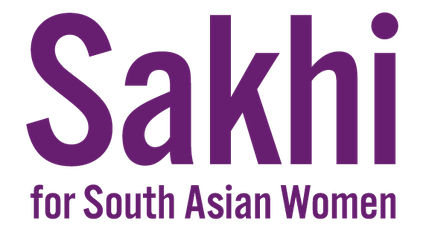
- Founded: 1989
- Origins: New York City
- Region served: New York City
- Website: www.sakhi.org

Sakhi for South Asian Women is an anti-domestic violence organization that works with the South Asian community in the New York metropolitan area.

== About ==
The organization is the second-oldest organization in the United States that is created for South Asian women. Since it was founded, Sakhi has helped more than 10,000 people experiencing violence. The organization also works with the South Asian immigrant community in New York City to prevent abuse. Sakhi, as an organization believes that it is important to not only advocate for women's safety, but also for their civil rights. Sakhi has consistently recognizes the intersectional nature of gender-based violence, immigration status, and south asian women.

Sakhi holds an annual benefit dinner in New York called "Celebrating Women's Lives". The dinner is both a fundraiser and a way to inform others about violence against women.

== History ==
The organization was founded in 1989 by Anannya Bhattacharjee, Mallika Dutt, Tula Goenka, Geetanjali Misra and Romita Shetty. The name "Sakhi" was picked as a way to symbolically connect south asian women because it means "woman friend" in Hindi, Urdu, and Bengali. Sakhi received early support from the New York Foundation, The National Coalition Against Domestic Violence, and the New York Asian Women's Center. The New York Asian Women's Center is now known as Womankind and still partners with Sakhi.

In 1993, Sakhi was run as a non-hierarchical group with about 20 women staffers who answered their hotline, referred callers to other services, and hosted survivor support groups. At that time, they had also published their own newsletter and spoke at mosques, temples, and churches with high South Asian populations. They had also started to produce their own video that portrays the specific struggles faced by immigrant South Asian Woman titled ''A Life Without Fear,'' which was published in 1994 and on display at the American Museum of Natural History in 1999. As of 1999, Sakhi had a 2 member staff, a board of directors, and around 50 women volunteers.

As of 2000, Sakhi also provides legal advice and language assistance in court cases and when navigating city services. For example, Sakhi has helped women obtain job training and access to housing or shelters. With the assistance of the Columbia University’s Social Intervention Group, Sakhi started to create their own local database. The New York Police department also worked with Sakhi to train police officers on abuse cases involving South Asian families.

Sakhi celebrated their 30th anniversary at the 2019 Women's March. In addition to being an official partner and participant in the 2019 Women’s March in New York, Sakhi was also a steering committee member to the Washington D.C. Women's march.

In response to COVID-19 pandemic, Sakhi created an online directory to COVID-19 information, mutual aid, and access to contraception. Additionally, the group created a texting option for their hotline and a food justice program to address survivors’ food insecurity.

In 2021, Sakhi hosted a conversation between domestic violence survivor Tanya Selvaratnam and In Her Words, a newsletter written by Journalist Alisha Haridasani Gupta.

On August 1, 2022, Sakhi was awarded $20,000 from the New York State Coalition Against Domestic Violence with support from the Allstate Foundation’s “Moving Ahead” program.

== People ==
In 2008- 2009, Purvi Shah was the executive director of Sakhi. Tiloma Jayasinghe was executive director in 2010. In June of 2015, Shalini Somayaji became the next Executive Director after serving as the Interim Executive Director since February of 2015. She was executive Director until 2017. From 2017 into 2022, Kavita Mehra served as Sakhi’s executive director.

== See also ==
- Domestic violence in the United States
- Womankind
