= P. C. Shastri =

Indian child psychiatrist

Priyavadan Chandrakant Shastri
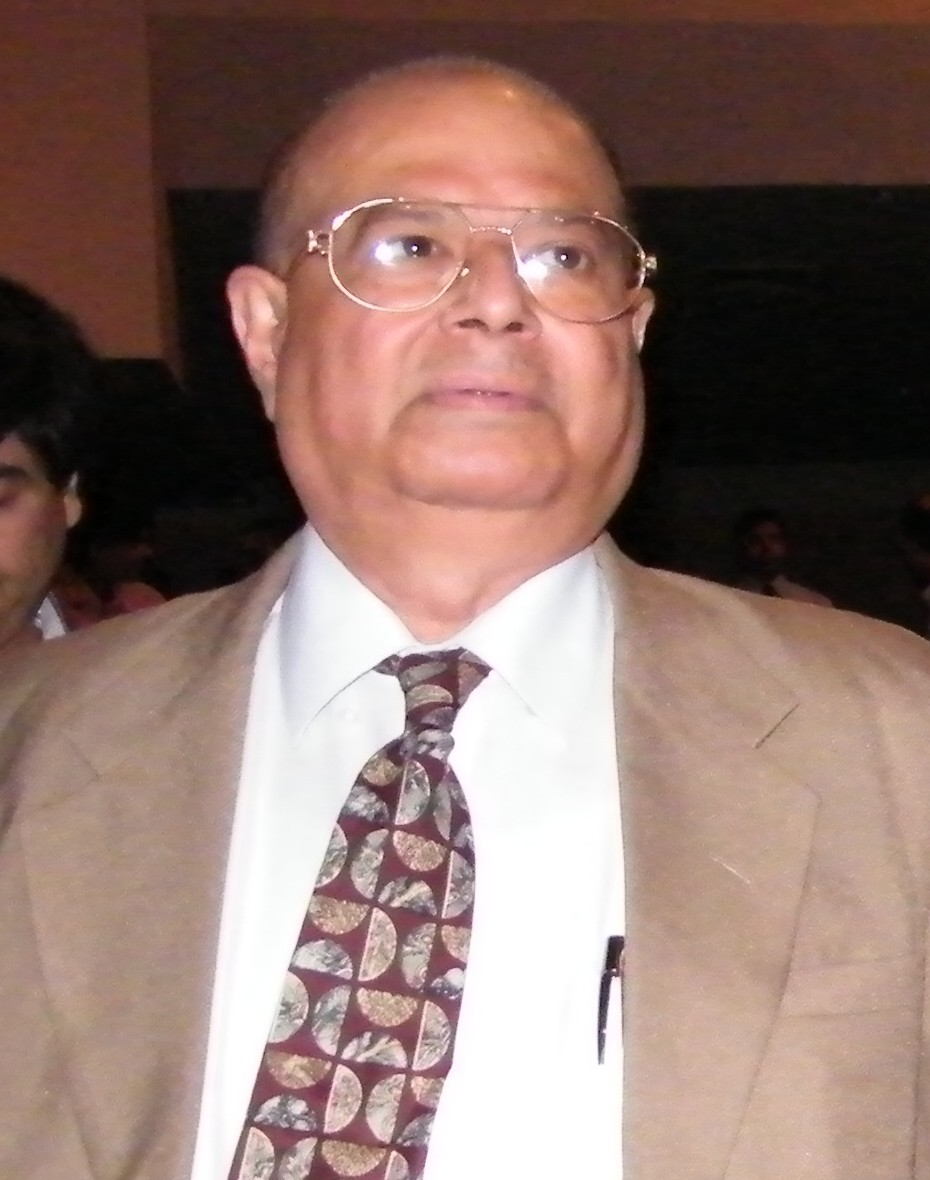
- Education: University of Bombay
- Alma mater: Topiwala National Medical College, Mumbai
- Occupation: Psychiatrist
- Years active: 1970–2016

Priyavadan Chandrakant Shastri (P. C. Shastri) (Marathi: प्रियवदन चंद्रकांत शास्त्री) was an Indian child psychiatrist, from Mumbai, Maharashtra.

== Education ==
P. C. Shastri completed his post graduation in the field of Psychiatry and Psychological Medicine in October 1970, from the Topiwala National Medical College and Nair Hospital in Mumbai.

== Career ==
After attaining the degree, Shastri was elected at the post of Professor and Head of the Unit in the Department of Psychiatry in the same hospital. He retired only in 1997. Later he continued at the Nanavati hospital in Andheri and the Indian Armed forces Medical Services, (INHS Ashwini) as an Honorary Professor in Psychiatry in 2004 to date.

He has been the past President of the Indian Psychiatric Society in 2008-09 and has presided the SAARC Psychiatric Federation in the same year.

He has presided over many conferences and medical meets throughout the world and the region:

- The Research Society for the care Treatment & Training of Children in Need of Special Care- (1998–2008)
- Maharashtra State branch of Indian Psychiatric Society (2003–05)
- Indian Association of Child and Adolescent Mental Health (2005–2007)
- Bombay Psychiatric Society (1985–86)
- Indian Psychiatric Society -West Zone (1995–96)
- Integrated Sensations –India(1996–99)
- President of first National Conference of Integrated Sensations - India 1996

== Awards and research ==
P. C. Shastri has worked in the field of research in Psychiatry. He won the Best paper -President Award four times in his career, in 1980, 1983, 1986 and 1996. He also won the silver medal with scroll of honors for Mental health and education by the Chief Minister of Maharashtra in September 1996. The Bombay Psychiatric Society acknowledged his work twice by awarding him the Dr. S. M. Lulla Oration Award in 1998 and Dr. V.N.Bagadia Lifetime achievement Award in 2007. He also went on to win the Dr. L.P. Shah Oration Award by the Indian Psychiatric Society's West Zone in 2007 and later the V.S. Mani Memorial Oration Award in 2009.

== Associations ==
He has been awarded Life Membership or Fellowship through various distinguished organisations in the field of Psychiatry such as World Psychiatric Association, American Psychiatric Association, Indian Psychiatric Society, SAARC Psychiatric Federation, Bombay Psychiatric Society, World Congress of Asian Psychiatry and many others. He was the President of the Center for Help & Intervention in Learning & Development (CHILD) from 1988 to 2008.
