= Ising (surname) =

Ising is a surname. Notable people with the surname include:

- Ernst Ising (1900–1998), German physicist
- Gustav Ising (1883–1960, né Nilsson), Swedish accelerator physicist
- Jane Ising (1902–2012), German-American economist
- Rudolf Ising (1903–1992), American animator

== See also ==
- Ising model, mathematical model of ferromagnetism in statistical mechanics
