= Vibrational solvatochromism =

Molecular changes due to solvent changes

Vibrational solvatochromism refers to changes in the vibrational frequencies of molecules due to variations in the solvent environment. Solvatochromism is a broader term that describes changes in the electronic or vibrational properties of a molecule in response to changes in the solvent polarity or composition. In the context of vibrational solvatochromism, researchers study how the vibrational spectra of a molecule, which represent the different vibrational modes of its chemical bonds, are influenced by the properties of the solvent.

Understanding vibrational solvatochromism helps researchers to characterize molecular environments and study molecular dynamics in different solvents and biological environments.

== Dielectric continuum model ==
By considering the intermolecular interaction of the solute molecule with a dielectric continuum solvent, one can obtain a general relationship between the vibrational frequency and intermolecular interaction potential. This relationship is given by the sum of three contributions: (1) Coulombic term describing an interaction between the permanent dipole moment of the molecule and electric field, (2) induction term describing interaction with the induced dipole moment, (3) electric field-correction term which arises from the change of the electric field along the normal coordinate of the vibration. When we consider only the linear terms with respect to the Onsagar reaction field, the frequency shift for the jth normal mode can be given as

$\Delta\omega_j=[-{\mathbf \mu}_j-\frac{1}{2}{\mathbf \mu}_j^{Ind}]\cdot{\mathbf E}^{Ons}+\Delta\omega_j({\mathbf E}^{Ons})$

where ${\mathbf \mu}_j$ and ${\mathbf \mu}_j^{Ind}$ are the effective gas-phase and solvent-induced vibrational dipole moment, respectively. Despite the limited validity due to the approximate nature of the dielectric continuum solvent model, researchers still often use this theory for vibrational solvatochromism, especially when a more refined model is challenging to implement.

== Electrostatic effect: distributed multipole analysis ==
The solvent electric field experienced by a given solute molecule in solution is highly nonuniform in space. For a realistic description of vibrational solvatochromism, one should consider the local electric potential created by surrounding solvent molecules. Assuming that the solute-solvent intermolecular interaction potential can be fully described by the distributed charges, dipoles, and high-order multipoles interacting with solvent electric potential and its gradients, it was shown that the vibrational solvatochromic frequency shift is given as

$\Delta\omega_j=\sum_x \{l_{x,j}\phi_x+{\mathbf \mu}_{x,j}\cdot\nabla\phi_x+ \frac{1}{3} \Theta_{x,j}:\nabla\otimes\nabla\phi_x +\frac{1}{15}\Omega_{x,j}:\nabla\otimes\nabla\otimes\nabla\phi_x+\cdots\}$

Here, the vibrational solvatochromic charge ($l_{x,j}$), dipole (${\mathbf \mu}_{x,j}$), quadrupole ($\Theta_{x,j}$), and octupole ($\Omega_{x,j}$) terms can be determined using any distributed multipole expansion method.[5] The above Equation can be interpreted as a type of vibrational spectroscopic map.

Quantum chemistry calculations conducted for various IR probes have revealed that terms up to vibrational solvatochromic quadrupoles are essential for adequately describing the vibrational frequency shift.

== Electrostatic effect: semiempirical approaches ==
The vibrational frequency shift, denoted as $\Delta\omega_j$, for the jth normal mode is defined as the difference between the actual vibrational frequency $\omega_j$ of the mode in a solution and the frequency $\omega_{j,0}$ in the gas phase.

An early approach aimed to express the solvation-induced vibrational frequency shift in terms of the solvent electric potentials evaluated at distributed atomic sites on the target solute molecule. This method involves calculating the solvent electric potentials at these specific solute sites through the utilization of atomic partial charges from surrounding solvent molecules. The vibrational frequency shift of the solute molecule, denoted as $\Delta\omega_j({\mathbf Q})$, for the jth vibrational mode with an atomic configuration ${\mathbf Q}$ of the solvent molecules can be represented as

$\Delta\omega_j({\mathbf Q})=\omega_j({\mathbf Q})-\omega_{j0}=\sum_{k=1}^N b_{jk}\phi_k({\mathbf Q})$

Here, $\omega_j({\mathbf Q})$ represents the vibrational frequency of the jth normal mode in solution, $\omega_{j0}$ signifies the vibrational frequency in the gas phase, $N$ denotes the number of distributed sites on the solute molecule, $\phi_k({\mathbf Q})$ denotes the solvent electric potential at the kth site of the solute molecule, and $b_{jk}$ are the parameters to be determined through least-square fitting to a training database comprising clusters containing a solute and multiple solvent molecules. This method provides a means to quantify the impact of solvation on the vibrational frequencies of the solute molecule.

Another widely used model for characterizing vibrational solvatochromic frequency shifts involves expressing the frequency shift in terms of solvent electric fields evaluated at distributed sites on the target solute molecule. This model is represented by the equation:

$\Delta\omega_j({\mathbf Q})=\sum_{m=x,y,z}\sum_{k=1}^N\mu_{jk}^m E_k^m({\mathbf Q})$

Here, $E_k^m({\mathbf Q})$ is the mth Cartesian component of the solvent electric field at the kth site on the solute molecule, and $\mu_{jk}^m$ represent parameters to be determined through least-square fitting to a training database of clusters containing a solute and multiple solvent molecules. This approach provides a framework for quantifying the influence of solvent electric fields on the vibrational frequencies of the solute molecule.

== General solute-solvent interaction effects ==
Buckingham developed the general theory describing the vibrational frequency shifts of a spatially localized normal mode in solution based on the intermolecular interaction potential. Cho later generalized this theory to any arbitrary normal mode. Solvation-induced vibrational frequencies and the resulting new set of normal modes of the solute molecule in solution can be directly obtained by diagonalizing the Hessian matrix derived from an effective Hamiltonian for the solute in the presence of a molecular environment. In the limiting case that the vibrational couplings of the normal mode of interest with other vibrational modes are relatively weak, the vibrational frequency shift is given by

$\Delta\omega_j^{WCA}=[\hat{F}_j^{EA}+\hat{F}_j^{MA}]U(\mathbf Q)\bigg\vert_0$

where $\hat{F}_j^{EA}$ and $\hat{F}_j^{MA}$ are the electric anharmonicity (EA) and mechanical anharmonicity (MA), respectively, defined as

$\hat{F}_j^{EA}=\frac{1}{2M_j\omega_j} \frac{\partial^2}{\partial Q_j^2}$

and

$\hat{F}_j^{MA}=-\frac{1}{2M_j\omega_j}\sum_i \frac{g_{ijj}}{M_i\omega_i^2} \frac{\partial}{\partial Q_i}$

where $g_{ijj}$ is the cubic anharmonic constant. There exist cases in which the weak coupling approximation cannot be acceptable, for example, when normal modes are coupled and delocalized. In those cases, an additional term describing the mode coupling contribution to the frequency shift should be included.

== See also ==
- Vibrational spectroscopic map
