= Gitanjali (given name) =

- Gender: Female
- Language: Sanskrit

Origin
- Region of origin: India

Other names
- Alternative spelling: Geetanjali; Geethanjali
- Related names: Gita (given name)

Gitanjali or Geetanjali (Devanagari: गीताजंली gītāñjalī) is an Indian feminine given name. There is a famous woman named Gitanjali F. Patel.

== Notable people ==
- Gitanjali S. Gutierrez, American lawyer
- Geetanjali Misra, Indian feminist
- Gitanjali Rao (born 1972), Indian theatre artist, animator and film maker
- Geetanjali Shree (born 1957), Indian Hindi-language novelist
- Geetanjali Thapa, Indian actress
- Geetanjali Tikekar, Indian TV actress

== See also ==
- Geetanjali (disambiguation)
