= Ajita Chakraborty =

Psychiatrist from India (1926–2015)

Ajita Chakraborty (1926–2015) was one of the first women psychiatrists in India.

== Early life and education ==
Chakraborty was born in Calcutta in the state of Bengal in 1926. She graduated from Scottish Church College in Calcutta in 1944, and in 1950 Chakraborty qualified as a doctor by graduating from Calcutta Medical College. She continued her medical education in the United Kingdom where she trained in psychiatry. In 1960 she went back to India, thereby becoming the first female psychiatrist in the country.

Chakraborty was involved in the Indian Psychiatric Society, starting first with a position as general secretary and eventually elected as president in 1976. She was the first woman to serve as president of the society.

== Career ==
She worked in the field of transcultural psychiatry. Her studies included the visual hallucinations of gods and goddess that she noted were particularly common in women. In 1991 she published an article titled Culture, colonialism, and psychiatry at the invitation of The Lancet. Following her death in 2015 her work was covered in a chapter by Mandira Sen and in a book on mental hospitals where Chakraborty described her experiences with the changing practice of psychiatry in India over the course of her career.

== Selected publications ==
- Chakraborty, Ajita (January 1966). "Visual Hallucination". Indian Journal of Psychiatry. 8 (1): 21. ISSN 0019-5545.
- Chakraborty, Ajita (1969–1970). "Birth Order and Mental Illness". British Journal of Social Psychiatry. 3 (4): 231–36.
- Chakraborty, Ajita (1983). "An epidemic of koro in west bengal (India)". Indian Journal of Psychiatry. 25 (2): 138–139. ISSN 0019-5545. PMC 3012338. PMID 21847272.
- Chakraborty, Ajita (1990). Social stress and mental health: a social-psychiatric field study of Calcutta (1. publ ed.). New Delhi: Sage Publications. ISBN 978-0-8039-9633-5.
- Chakraborty, Ajita (2010). My Life as a Psychiatrist – Memoirs and Essays. Stree. ISBN 978-81-85604-92-3.

== Honors and awards ==
The Bombay Psychiatric Society awarded her with a lifetime achievement award.
