= Oronike Odeleye =

Arts consultant

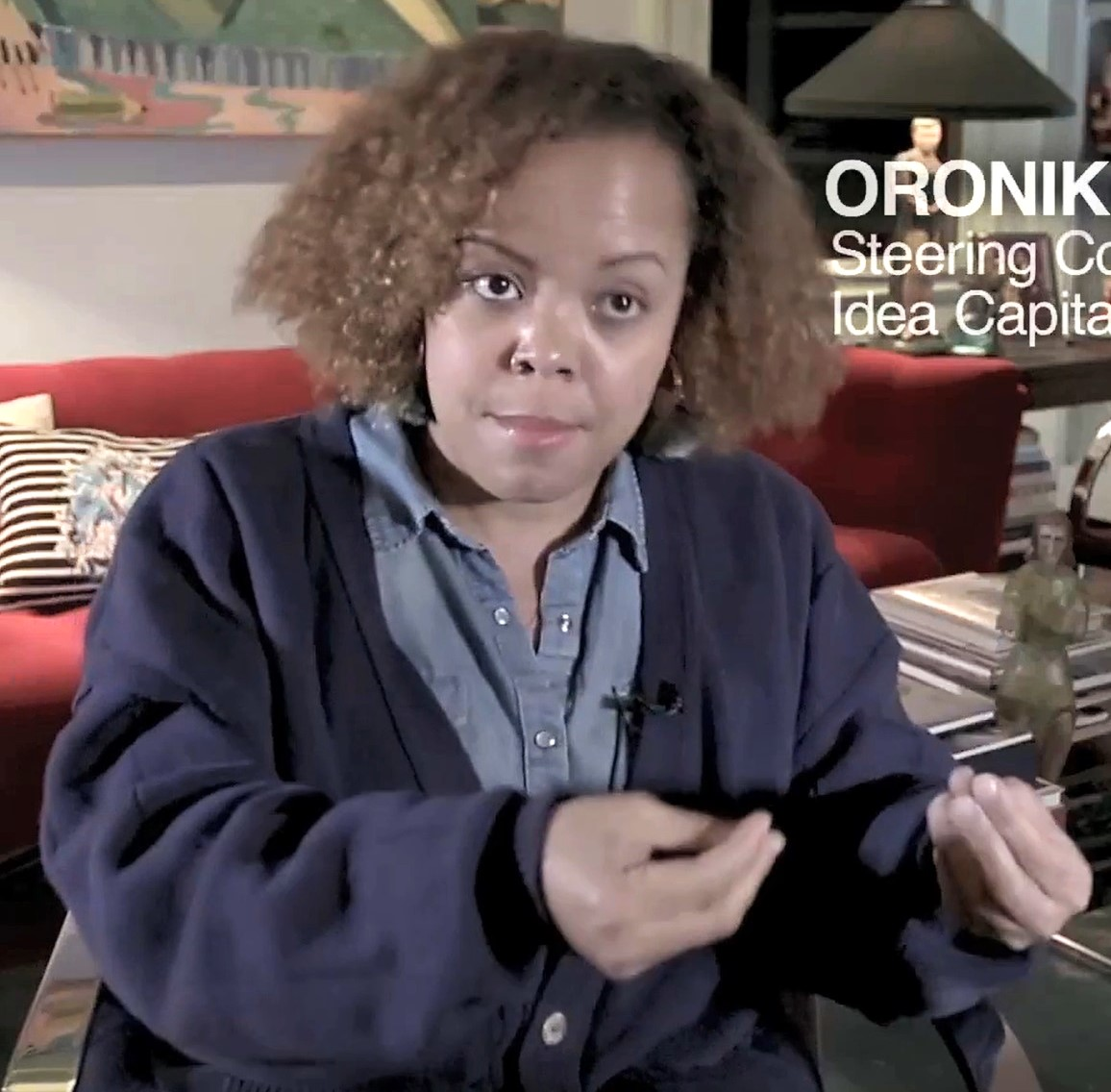
- Odeleye in 2018 for the ArtsATL Kindle Award
- Born: Washington, D.C.
- Occupations: Arts consultant, activist
- Known for: Mute R. Kelly co-founder

Oronike Odeleye (born 1979/1980) is an American arts consultant and activist based in Atlanta, Georgia. She is best known as the co-creator of the #MuteRKelly movement.

== Life and career ==
Odeleye was born in Washington, D.C. and moved to Atlanta, Georgia, where she grew up, at the age of three. Her father, an African-American sculptor, spent time in Nigeria after completing college and selected her first name from a list bestowed upon him by a Nigerian elder. She received her bachelor's degree in film studies from Syracuse University. Odeleye is an Atlanta-based arts and entertainment consultant.

In 2017, after allegations that singer R. Kelly was maintaining a sex cult involving young black women, Odeleye created a petition to ban Kelly's music from Atlanta radio stations. Soon after, Kenyette Tisha Barnes contacted Odeleye to invite her to collaborate on creating a grassroots digital campaign to boycott his music, which became #MuteRKelly. Odeleye also discussed the campaign in the 2019 documentary series Surviving R. Kelly.

In November 2022, Odeleye became the artistic director of the National Black Arts Festival. She had previously served as the festival director for "One Musicfest". One of her major goals was to build a funding model not as susceptible to changing priorities of funders while also advocating for Black art and the Black community itself.

=== Accolades ===
- The Root 100, The Root (2019)
- Activist Impact Award, Breakthrough Inspiration Awards (2019)
- Visionary Award, Resilience (2019)
- OkayAfrica's 100 Women, OkayAfrica (2019)
