= Hugh Zachary =

American novelist

Hugh Zachary (January 12, 1928 – September 5, 2016) was an American novelist who has written science fiction novels under the pseudonyms Zach Hughes and Evan Innes (the latter for the America 2040 series). His other pseudonyms include Peter Kanto and Pablo Kane. He described himself as "the most published, underpaid, and most unknown writer in the U.S."

Some of his novels appear to be set in a shared universe, one where Earth experiences a nuclear apocalypse shortly after launching a colonization fleet to settle new worlds among the stars.

== Biography ==
Zachary was born in Holdenville, Oklahoma on January 12, 1928. He received his education from the University of North Carolina at Chapel Hill. He served in the U.S. Army and worked in broadcast journalism in Florida. Zachary started writing as a full-time occupation along with his wife Elizabeth in 1963.

== Works ==
- One Day In Hell (1961, Hugh Zachary) Novel Books
- A Feast Of Fat Things (1968) Harris-Wolfe
- Second Chance (1976) Major Books ISBN 0-89041-115-8
- Desert Battle (1983) Dell ISBN 0-440-02065-4
- Bitter Victory (1983) Dell ISBN 0-440-00648-1
- The Venus Venture (1986, Hugh Zachary) Vanguard ISBN 0-8149-0915-9 (Crime / Mystery genre)

=== Science fiction ===
Near all of Hugh Zachary's science fiction stories were written under the pseudonym Zach Hughes. The exceptions have the name used listed after the publication date. For example, The World where Sex was Born was written using the pseudonym, Peter Kanto.

- The World where Sex was Born (1968, Peter Kanto) Ophelia Press OPH-123
- Rosy Cheeks (1969, Peter Kanto) Bee-Line
- A Dick for All Seasons (1970, Pablo Kane) Ophelia Press OPH-206
- Gwen, in Green (1974, Hugh Zachary) Fawcett Gold Medal M2982
- Seed of the Gods (1974) Berkley Medallion ISBN 0-425-02642-6
- Tide (1974) Berkley/Putnam ISBN 0-399-11358-4
- The Stork Factor (1975) Berkley Medallion ISBN 0-425-02781-3
- The St. Francis Effect (1976) Berkley Medallion ISBN 0-425-03111-X
- For Texas and Zed (1976) Popular Library ISBN 0-445-00370-7
- Tiger in the Stars (1976) Laser Books ISBN 0-373-72049-1
- Pressure Man (1980) Signet / New American Library ISBN 0-451-09498-0
- Sundrinker (1987) DAW Books ISBN 0-88677-213-3
- Life Force (1988) DAW Books ISBN 0-88677-297-4
- The Revenant (1988, Hugh Zachary) Onyx / New American Library ISBN 0-451-40092-5

==== Thunderworld science fiction series ====
- The Book of Rack the Healer (1973, Zach Hughes) Award Books AN1149
- The Legend of Miaree (1974) Ballantine Books ISBN 0-345-23888-5
- Killbird (1980) Signet / New American Library ISBN 0-451-09263-5
- Thunderworld (1982, Zach Hughes) Signet / New American Library ISBN 0-451-11290-3
- Gold Star (1983) Signet / New American Library ISBN 0-451-12625-4
- Closed System (1986) Signet / New American Library ISBN 0-451-14170-9
- The Dark Side (1987) Signet / New American Library ISBN 0-451-15111-9
- Mother Lode (1991) DAW Books ISBN 0-88677-497-7
- Deep Freeze (1992) DAW Books ISBN 0-88677-539-6
- The Omnificence Factor (1994) DAW Books ISBN 0-88677-588-4

NOTE: The Thunderworld series shares a common history, stellar cartography, and sometimes characters.

==== America 2040 science fiction series ====
The America 2040 series was written using the pseudonym Evan Innes.

- America 2040 (1986) Bantam Books ISBN 0-553-25541-X
- The Golden World (1986) Bantam Books ISBN 0-553-25922-9
- The City in the Mist (1987) Bantam Books ISBN 0-553-26204-1
- The Return (1988) Bantam Books ISBN 0-553-27184-9
- The Star Explorer (1988) Bantam Books ISBN 0-553-27402-3

=== Westerns ===
- Dos Caballos (1989, Hugh Zachary) M. Evans ISBN 0-87131-577-7

==== Sheriff Jugg Watson western series ====
- Bloodrush (1981, Hugh Zachary) Leisure ISBN 0-8439-0857-2 – A string of killings in Earlysberg, a quiet Southern town, seem to suggest ritual voodoo and black magic.
- Murder In White (1981, Hugh Zachary) Leisure ISBN 0-8439-0876-9

==== Tusk Smith western series ====
- To Guard the Right (1981, Hugh Zachary) Worldwide Library (Raven House) ISBN 0-373-63008-5
- Top Level Death (1981, Hugh Zachary) Worldwide Library (Raven House) ISBN 0-373-60049-6

==== The Sierra Leone romance/western series ====
- Flight To Freedom (1981, Hugh Zachary) Dell ISBN 0-440-02614-8
- Freedom's Passion (1981, Hugh Zachary) Dell ISBN 0-440-02769-1
- Treasure of Hope (1982, Hugh Zachary) Dell ISBN 0-440-08528-4
- Freedom's Victory (1982, Hugh Zachary) Dell ISBN 0-440-02520-6

=== Romance novels ===
- Love and Battle (1980, Hugh & Elizabeth Zachary) Ballantine ISBN 0-345-28610-3

=== Nonfiction ===
- The Beachcomber's Handbook of Seafood Cookery (1969, Hugh Zachary) John F. Blair ISBN 0-910244-55-3
- Wild Card Poker (1976, Hugh Zachary) Stephen Green Press ISBN 0-8289-0250-X
