= Mallika Dutt =

Indian activist

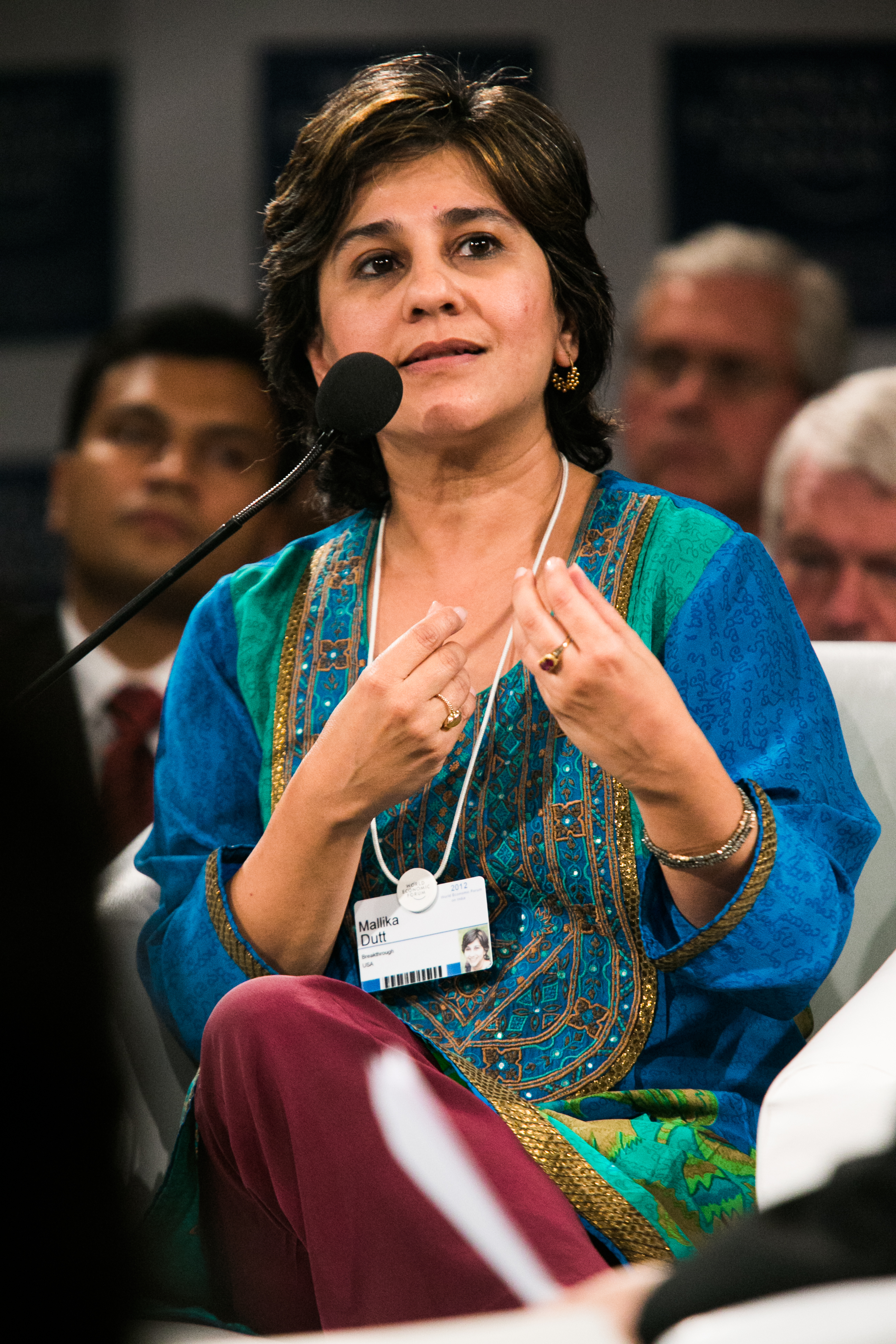
Mallika Dutt at the World Economic Forum on India 2012

Mallika Dutt leads Inter-Connected, a new initiative that uplifts the independent nature of self, community and planet to advance collective wellbeing. She brings together the power of ancient wisdom and spiritual practices with contemporary technologies and storytelling. Dutt is the founder of Breakthrough, a human rights organization dedicated to making violence against women unacceptable.

Dutt served as Founder, President and CEO of Breakthrough until March 2017. Dutt has twice been named one of Verve's Top 50 most influential women and has received multiple awards in recognition of her human rights activism, including the 2016 Skoll Award for Social Entrepreneurship. Dutt is co-founder of Sakhi for South Asian Women, a women's rights organization.

== Early life and education ==
Dutt was born in Kolkata, India in 1962, and grew up in Kolkata and Mirzapur. She received a Bachelor of Arts in International Affairs at Mount Holyoke College. Dutt also received a Masters in International Affairs and South Asian Studies from Columbia University in 1986, and graduated with a Juris Doctor from New York University Law School in 1989. In May 2012, Dutt received an Honorary Doctorate in Humane Letters from Mount Holyoke College.

== Career ==
=== Breakthrough ===
In 2000, Dutt founded Breakthrough with Mann ke Manjeeré, an album and music video on women's rights. Launched as an experiment in using pop culture and media for social justice, Mann ke Manjeeré remained on the Indian pop charts for six weeks, going on to win the 2001 National Screen Award in India for Best Music Video. Breakthrough produced various multimedia campaigns including social change video games, ICED and America 2049, that addressed immigrant rights in the United States. Breakthrough's highly successful Bell Bajao (Ring the Bell) campaign, calling on men and boys to get engaged in the movement for women's equality, won the 2010: Silver Lion at Cannes International Advertising Film Festival. Working from centers in India and the United States, Breakthrough's mission is to build a world in which violence against women is unacceptable and all beings can thrive.

=== Early career and activism ===
==== Sakhi for South Asian Women ====
In 1989, Dutt co-founded SAKHI for South Asian Women, an organization providing community support to end violence against women of South Asian origin. SAKHI creates a safe space for education and other support services, while also engaging a broader South Asian community against domestic violence.

==== Norman Foundation and Hunter College ====
From 1992-1994, Dutt worked as a director at the Norman Foundation, a New York-based organization supporting efforts of communities to determine their own economic, environmental and social well-being.

==== Rutgers University Center for Women's Global Leadership ====
In 1994 -1996, Dutt served as the Associate Director of Rutgers University, Center for Women's Global Leadership. In this role, Dutt directed the Center's contributions to UN World Conferences including Hearings and Tribunals at World Summit on Social Development, International Conference on Population and Development, and World Conference on Women.

==== Ford Foundation ====
From 1996 to 2000, Dutt served as Program Officer for Human Rights at the Ford Foundation in New Delhi. Dutt initiated the Foundation's work in police reform and forged partnerships among police, NGOs, and civil society groups.

== Boards and committees ==
Dutt has served on several boards and committees, including:

- Global Agenda Council on Social Media, World Economic Forum 2014
- Board of Directors, Peace is Loud 2014
- Board of Advocates, Planned Parenthood Federation of America 2014
- Global Agenda Council on India, World Economic Forum 2014
- Board of Directors, NEO Philanthropy 2014
- Advisory Board, Unitarian Universalist Holdeen India Fund 2013
- Board of Directors, Public Interest Projects 2012
- U.S. Programs Board, Open Society Foundations 2011
- Global Agenda Council on Human Rights, World Economic Forum 2011
- Regional Agenda Council on India, World Economic Forum; current focus on governance and transparency 2010 – 2011
- Advisory Board, Games for Change 2011
- Board of Directors, WITNESS: video and technology for human rights 2001 – 2011
- Member, Council on Foreign Relations 2011
- Advisory Committee, Human Rights Watch Asia 2011
- Visiting Social Activist, Twink Frey, Center for the Education of Women, University of Michigan Spring 2009
- Scholar in Residence, Human Rights Program, College of New Rochelle, School of Arts and Sciences Spring 2002
- International Advisory Committee, Association for Women's Rights in Development Conference, Reinventing Globalization, Mexico 2002
- Social Action Committee, MediaRights.org 2002
- Visiting Scholar, Center for the Study of Human Rights, Columbia University 2001
- Member, New Delhi Lt. Governor Committee on Public Police Relations 2000

== Awards and honors ==
- Skoll Award for Social Entrepreneurship, The Skoll Foundation, 2016
- 21 Leaders for the 21st Century, Women's eNews 2016
- India Abroad Gopal Raju Award for Service to the Community, India Abroad 2014
- Lipman Family Prize, Wharton School at the University of Pennsylvania 2014
- 50 Fearless Minds Changing the World, Daily Muse, 2013
- International Humanitarian Award, Yo Dona (Spain), 2013
- Honorary Doctorate in Humane Letters, Mount Holyoke College, 2012
- Distinguished Service, Diversity & Progress Award, South Asian Law Students Association of New York Law School, 2010
- Karmaveer Puraskar: National Award for Social Justice & Citizen Action, Indian Confederation of NGOs, 2009
- American Courage Award, Asian American Justice Center, 2009
- Trailblazer Award, South Asians in Media Marketing Association (SAMMA), 2008
- The Woman of Color, Woman of Courage Award, IUP Women's Studies Program, 2008
- Award for Distinguished Service, New York University School of Law BLAPA Alumni Association, 2006
