= Lattice density functional theory =

Lattice density functional theory (LDFT) is a statistical theory used in physics and thermodynamics to model a variety of physical phenomena with simple lattice equations.

== Description ==
Lattice models with nearest-neighbor interactions have been used extensively to model a wide variety of systems and phenomena, including the lattice gas, binary liquid solutions, order-disorder phase transitions, ferromagnetism, and antiferromagnetism. Most calculations of correlation functions for nonrandom configurations are based on statistical mechanical techniques, which lead to equations that usually need to be solved numerically.

In 1925, Ising gave an exact solution to the one-dimensional (1D) lattice problem. In 1944 Onsager was able to get an exact solution to a two-dimensional (2D) lattice problem at the critical density. However, to date, no three-dimensional (3D) problem has had a solution that is both complete and exact. Over the last ten years, Aranovich and Donohue have developed lattice density functional theory (LDFT) based on a generalization of the Ono-Kondo equations to three-dimensions, and used the theory to model a variety of physical phenomena.

The theory starts by constructing an expression for free energy, A=U-TS, where internal energy U and entropy S can be calculated using mean field approximation. The grand potential is then constructed as Ω=A-μΦ, where μ is a Lagrange multiplier which equals to the chemical potential, and Φ is a constraint given by the lattice.

It is then possible to minimize the grand potential with respect to the local density, which results in a mean-field expression for local chemical potential. The theory is completed by specifying the chemical potential for a second (possibly bulk) phase. In an equilibrium process, μ_{I}=μ_{II}.

Lattice density functional theory has several advantages over more complicated free volume techniques such as perturbation theory and the statistical associating fluid theory, including mathematical simplicity and ease of incorporating complex boundary conditions. Although this approach is known to give only qualitative information about the thermodynamic behavior of a system, it provides important insights about the mechanisms of various complex phenomena such as phase transition, aggregation, configurational distribution, surface-adsorption, self-assembly, crystallization, as well as steady state diffusion.
