= Lars Onsager =

Norwegian-American physical chemist and theoretical physicist (1903-1976)

Lars Onsager ForMemRS
- Lars Onsager
- Born: 27 November 1903; Kristiania (Oslo), Norway
- Died: 5 October 1976 (aged 72); Coral Gables, Florida, U.S.
- Education: Yale University; Norwegian University of Science and Technology
- Known for: Quantum vortex; Negative temperature; Onsager–Machlup function; Onsager reaction field; Onsager hard rod model; Onsager regression hypothesis; Debye–Hückel–Onsager equation; Onsager reciprocal relations; Square lattice Ising model; Revealing the physics behind the De Haas–van Alphen effect and the Wien effect
- Awards: Lorentz Medal (1958); Willard Gibbs Award (1962); Peter Debye Award (1965); Nobel Prize in Chemistry (1968); National Medal of Science (1968)
- Scientific career
- Fields: Physical chemist
- Workplaces: ETH Zürich; Johns Hopkins University; Brown University; Yale University; University of Miami
- Thesis: Solutions of the Mathieu Equation of Period 4π and Certain Related Functions (1935)
- Doctoral students: Joseph L. McCauley

Lars Onsager (27 November 1903 – 5 October 1976) was a Norwegian American physical chemist and theoretical physicist. He held the Gibbs Professorship of Theoretical Chemistry at Yale University. He was awarded the Nobel Prize in Chemistry in 1968.

== Education and early life ==
Lars Onsager was born in Kristiania (now Oslo), Norway. His father was a lawyer. After completing secondary school in Oslo, he attended the Norwegian Institute of Technology (NTH) in Trondheim, graduating as a chemical engineer in 1925. While there, he worked through A Course of Modern Analysis, which was instrumental in his later work.

== Career and research ==
In 1925, he arrived at a correction to the Debye–Hückel theory of electrolytic solutions, to specify Brownian movement of ions in solution, and during 1926 published it. He traveled to Zürich, where Peter Debye was teaching, and confronted Debye, telling him his theory was wrong. He impressed Debye so much that he was invited to become Debye's assistant at the Eidgenössische Technische Hochschule (ETH), where he remained until 1928.

=== Johns Hopkins University ===
In 1928, he went to the United States to take a faculty position at the Johns Hopkins University (JHU) in Baltimore, Maryland. At JHU, he had to teach freshman classes in chemistry, and it quickly became apparent that, while he was a genius at developing theories in physical chemistry, he had little talent for teaching. He was dismissed by JHU after one semester.

=== Brown University ===
On leaving JHU, he accepted a position (involving the teaching of statistical mechanics to graduate students in chemistry) at Brown University in Providence, Rhode Island, where it became clear that he was no better at teaching advanced students than freshmen, but he made significant contributions to statistical mechanics and thermodynamics. His graduate student Raymond Fuoss worked under him and eventually joined him on the Yale chemistry faculty. His statistical mechanics course was nicknamed "Sadistical Mechanics" by the students.

His research at Brown was concerned mainly with the effects on diffusion of temperature gradients, and produced the Onsager reciprocal relations in statistical mechanics, a set of equations published in 1929 and, in an expanded form, in 1931, whose importance went unrecognized for many years. However, their value became apparent during the decades following World War II, and by 1968 they were considered important enough to gain Onsager that year's Nobel Prize in Chemistry.

In 1933, when the Great Depression limited Brown's ability to support a faculty member who was useful only as a researcher, not a teacher, he was let go by Brown. He traveled to Austria to visit electrochemist Hans Falkenhagen. He met Falkenhagen's sister-in-law, Margrethe Arledter. They were married on September 7, 1933, and had three sons and a daughter.

=== Yale University ===
After the trip to Europe, he was hired by Yale University, where he remained for most of the rest of his life, retiring in 1972.

At Yale, he had been hired as a postdoctoral fellow, but it was discovered that he had never received a Ph.D. While he had submitted an outline of his work in reciprocal relations to the Norwegian Institute of Technology, they had decided it was too incomplete to qualify as a doctoral dissertation. He was told that he could submit one of his published papers to the Yale faculty as a dissertation, but insisted on doing a new research project instead. His dissertation laid the mathematical background for his interpretation of deviations from Ohm's law in weak electrolytes. It dealt with the solutions of the Mathieu equation of period $4\pi$ and certain related functions and was beyond the comprehension of the chemistry and physics faculty. Only when some members of the mathematics department, including the director of graduate studies Einar Hille (who also liked A Course of Modern Analysis), insisted that the work was good enough that they would grant the doctorate if the chemistry department would not, was he granted a PhD in chemistry in 1935.

Even before the dissertation was finished, he was appointed assistant professor in 1934, and promoted to associate professor in 1940. He quickly showed at Yale the same traits he had at JHU and Brown: he produced brilliant theoretical research but was incapable of delivering a lecture at a level a student (even a graduate student) could comprehend. He was also unable to direct graduate students' research, except for the occasional outstanding student. His two courses on statistical mechanics were nicknamed "Advanced Norwegian I" and "Advanced Norwegian II" for being incomprehensible.

During the late 1930s, Onsager researched the dipole theory of dielectrics, making improvements for another topic that had been studied by Peter Debye. However, when he submitted his paper to a journal edited by Debye in 1936, it was rejected. Debye would not accept Onsager's ideas until after World War II. During the 1940s, Onsager studied the statistical-mechanical theory of phase transitions in solids, deriving a mathematically elegant theory which was enthusiastically received. In what is widely considered a tour de force of mathematical physics, he obtained the exact solution for the two-dimensional Ising model in zero field in 1944.

In 1960, he was awarded an honorary degree, doctor techn. honoris causa, at the Norwegian Institute of Technology, later part of Norwegian University of Science and Technology.

In 1945, Onsager was naturalized as an American citizen, and the same year he was awarded the title of J. Willard Gibbs Professor of Theoretical Chemistry. This was particularly appropriate because Onsager, like Willard Gibbs, had been involved primarily in the application of mathematics to problems in physics and chemistry and, in a sense, could be considered to be continuing in the same areas Gibbs had pioneered. In 1947, he was elected to the National Academy of Sciences, the American Academy of Arts and Sciences in 1949, and in 1950 he joined the ranks of Alpha Chi Sigma.

After World War II, Onsager pursued new areas of research. He proposed a theoretical explanation of the superfluidity properties of liquid helium in 1949; two years later, the physicist Richard Feynman independently proposed the same theory. He also worked on the theories of liquid crystals and the electrical properties of ice. While on a Fulbright scholarship at the University of Cambridge, he worked on the magnetic properties of metals. He developed important ideas on the quantization of magnetic flux in metals. He was awarded the Lorentz Medal in 1958, Willard Gibbs Award in 1962, and the Nobel Prize in Chemistry in 1968. He was elected a member of the American Philosophical Society in 1959 and a Foreign Member of the Royal Society (ForMemRS) in 1975.

=== After Yale ===
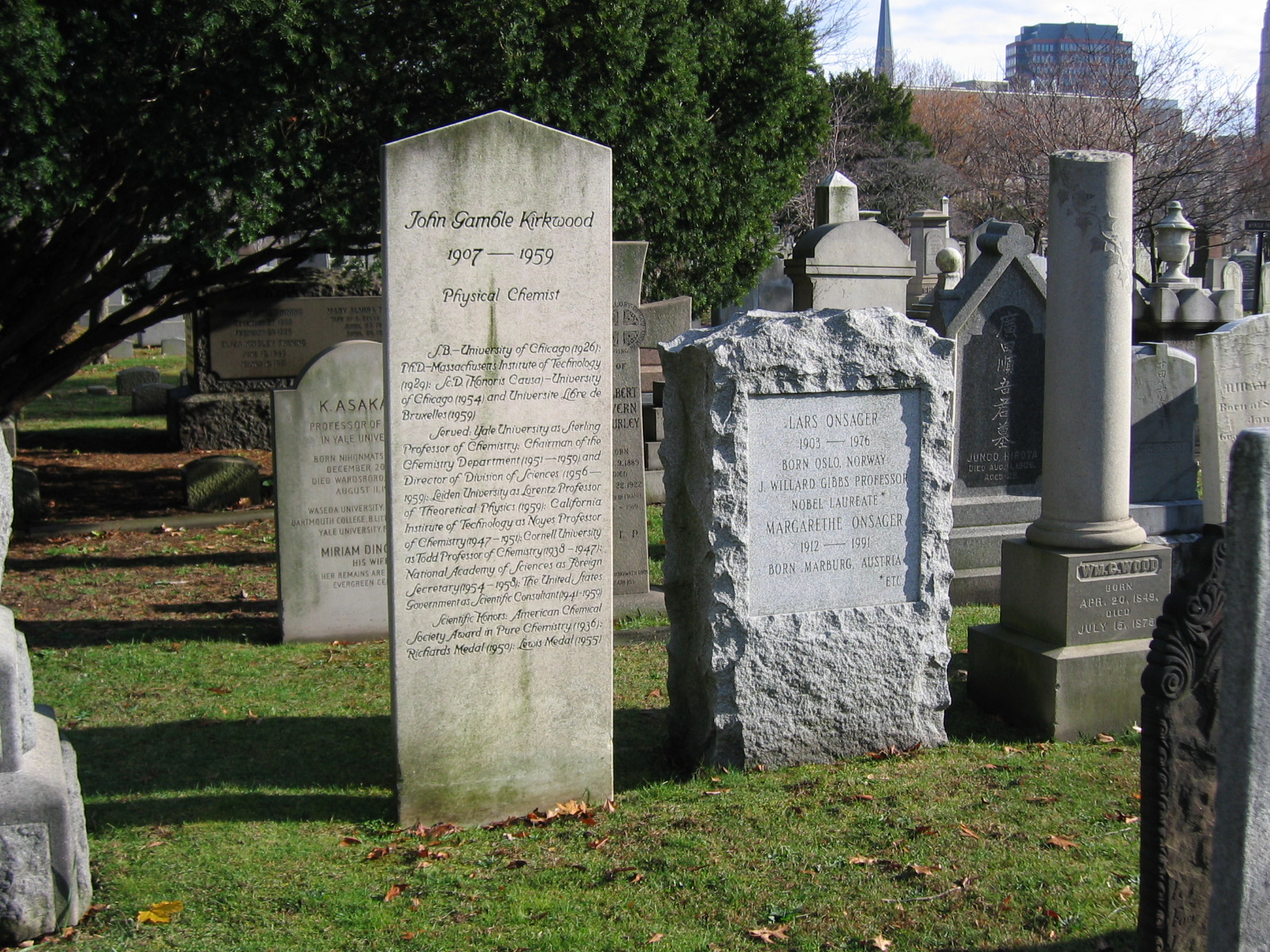
Graves of Onsager and John Gamble Kirkwood

In 1972, Onsager retired from Yale and became an emeritus professor. He then became a member of the Center for Theoretical Studies, University of Miami, and was appointed Distinguished University Professor of Physics. At the University of Miami he remained active in guiding and inspiring postdoctoral students as his teaching skills, although not his lecturing skills, had improved during the course of his career. He developed an interest in semiconductor physics, biophysics, and radiation chemistry. However, he died before he could achieve any breakthroughs comparable to those of his earlier years.

== Research ==
=== Exact solution of the 2D Ising model ===
To solve the 2D Ising model, Onsager began by diagonalizing increasingly large transfer matrices. He said that this was because he had a lot of time during WWII. He began by computing the 2 × 2 transfer matrix of the 1D Ising model, which had already been solved by Ernst Ising himself. He then computed the transfer matrix of the "Ising ladder", meaning two 1D Ising models side-by-side, connected by links. The transfer matrix is then 4 × 4. He repeated this for up to six 1D Ising models, resulting in transfer matrices of up to 64 × 64. He diagonalized all of them and found that all the eigenvalues were of a special form, so he guessed that the algebra of the problem was an associative algebra (later called the Onsager algebra).

The solution involved generalized quaternion algebra and the theory of elliptic functions, which he learned from A Course of Modern Analysis.

== Personal life ==
He remained in Florida until his death from an aneurysm in Coral Gables, Florida in 1976. Onsager was buried next to John Gamble Kirkwood at New Haven's Grove Street Cemetery. While Kirkwood's tombstone has a long list of awards and positions, including the American Chemical Society Award in Pure Chemistry, the Richards Medal, and the Lewis Award, Onsager's tombstone, in its original form, simply said "Nobel Laureate". When Onsager's wife, Gretel, died in 1991 and was buried there, his children added an asterisk after "Nobel Laureate" and "*etc." in the lower-right corner of the stone. He was identified as a Protestant.

=== Legacy ===
The Norwegian Institute of Technology established the Lars Onsager Lecture and The Lars Onsager Professorship in 1993 to award outstanding scientists in the scientific fields of Lars Onsager; Chemistry, Physics and Mathematics. The American Physical Society established Lars Onsager Prize in statistical physics in 1993. In 1997, his sons and daughter donated his scientific works and professional belongings to NTNU (before 1996, NTH) in Trondheim, Norway, his alma mater. These are now organized as The Lars Onsager Archive at the Gunnerus Library in Trondheim.

== See also ==
- Lattice density functional theory (1944) solution to a two-dimensional (2D) lattice problem
