= Vinay Kumar (psychiatrist) =

Indian psychiatrist

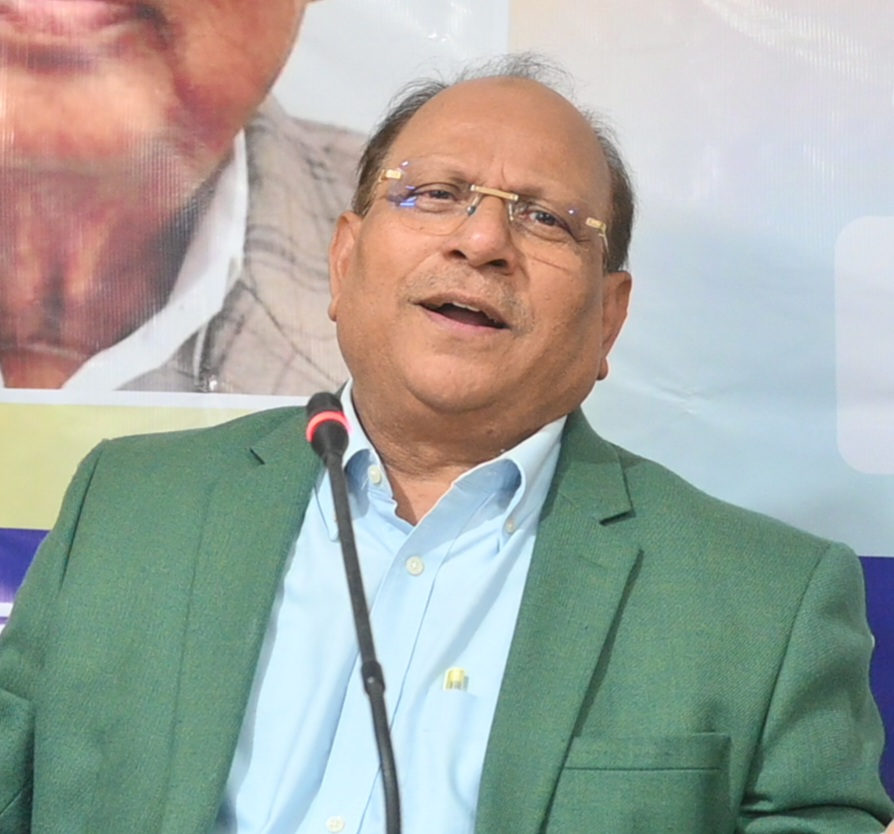
- Vinay Kumar on 7 February 2026
- Born: 9 June 1961 (age 65); Kandoul village, Jehanabad, Bihar, India
- Education: MBBS (Hons), MD (Psychiatry), Patna Medical College
- Occupations: Psychiatrist, poet, author
- Known for: President, Indian Psychiatric Society
- Awards: Dr. Ramchandra N. Murthy Award (2007), Ayodhya Prasad Khatri Memorial Award (2015), Banarsi Das Bhojpuri Award (2019)

Vinay Kumar (born 9 June 1961) is an Indian psychiatrist, poet, and author based in Patna, Bihar. He served as the General Secretary of the Indian Psychiatric Society from 2018 to 2020, later as its Vice-President during 2022–2023, and subsequently as the President of the society from 2023 to 2024. He has also represented South Asia as a board member of the World Psychiatric Association.

Vinay Kumar was born in Kandoul village in Jehanabad District, Bihar, India. He completed his medical education at Patna Medical College and Hospital, where he earned an MBBS (Hons) degree followed by an MD in Psychiatry. Since then, he has been involved in clinical practice as well as academic and public engagement related to mental health and psychiatry in India.

Apart from his professional work in psychiatry, Kumar has also been active in literary writing. His published books include poetry collections such as क़र्ज़ ए तहज़ीब एक दुनिया है, आम्रपाली और अन्य कविताएँ, मॉल में कबूतर, यक्षिणी, and पानी जैसा देस. He has also written a verse play titled आत्मज and non-fiction works including एक मनोचिकित्सक के नोट्स and मनोचिकित्सा संवाद, which deal with psychological and social themes.

Kumar has contributed numerous articles on mental health to newspapers and magazines and initiated the Hindi mental health magazine मनोवेद डाइजेस्ट, aimed at promoting awareness and dialogue on mental health in Hindi.

For his contributions to psychiatry and literature, Vinay Kumar has received several recognitions, including the Dr. Ramchandra N. Murthy Award (2007) from the Indian Medical Association, the Ayodhya Prasad Khatri Memorial Award (2015) for his book एक मनोचिकित्सक के नोट्स, and the Banarsi Das Bhojpuri Award (2019) for his contribution to poetry.
