= Vibrational spectroscopic map =

Data models for IR probes

Vibrational spectroscopic maps are a series of ab initio, semiempirical, or empirical models tailored to specific IR probes to describe vibrational solvatochromic effects on molecular spectra quantitatively.

Coherent multidimensional spectroscopy, a nonlinear spectroscopy utilizing multiple time-delayed pulses, is a technique that enables the measurement of solvation-induced frequency shifts and the time-correlations of the fluctuating frequencies. Researchers employ various organic and biochemical methods to introduce small vibrational probes into molecular systems into a variety of chemicals, proteins, nucleic acids, etc. These probes, labeled with infrared (IR) markers, were subject to spectroscopic investigations to obtain quantitative insights into various features of chemical and biological systems. In general, interpreting the experimental multidimensional spectra to get information on the underlying molecular processes requires theoretical modeling.

The vibrational frequency shifts observed due to complex intermolecular interactions of small IR probes with surroundings in the condensed phase are minute, often representing fractions of thermal energy. Numerical accuracy associated with advanced quantum mechanical calculations are not sufficient to accurately model these shifts. Consequently, researchers commonly resort to mapping procedures, which correlate certain physical variables calculated for the probe molecule with spectroscopic properties such as vibrational frequencies. These mapping procedures are referred to as vibrational spectroscopic maps within the field.

Typically, the physical variables employed in vibrational frequency maps include electric potentials, electric fields, distributed higher multipole moments, and other relevant factors evaluated at specific points surrounding the molecule.

As an example, the vibrational frequency associated with a localized vibrational mode is correlated with the electrostatic potential and electric field values at a designated set of points known as distributed sites within the infrared (IR) chromophore.

== Theoretical foundation ==
The vibrational frequency shift, denoted as $\Delta\omega_j$, for the jth normal mode of a given probe molecule is defined as the difference between the actual vibrational frequency $\omega_j$ of the mode in a solution and the frequency $\omega_{j,0}$ in the gas phase.

$\Delta\omega\equiv\omega_j-\omega_{j,0}$

From an effective Hamiltonian for the solute in the presence of molecular environment, one can derive the effective vibrational force constant (or Hessian) matrix approximately as follows:

$k_{jk}\approx M_j\omega_j^2\delta_{jk}+\frac{\partial^2U(\mathbf Q)}{\partial Q_j\partial Q_k} \bigg\vert_{0} - \sum_i \frac{q_{ijk}}{M_i\omega_i^2} \frac{\partial U(Q)}{\partial Q_i} \bigg\vert_0$

where the subscript 0 means the quantity is evaluated at the gas-phase geometry.

In the limiting case that the vibrational couplings of the normal mode of interest with other vibrational modes are relatively weak, the vibrational frequency shift under such a weak coupling approximation (WCA) in solution from the gas-phase frequency is given by

$\Delta\omega_j^{WCA}=[\hat{F}_j^{EA}+\hat{F}_j^{MA}]U(\mathbf Q)\bigg\vert_0$

Here, $\hat{F}_j^{EA}$ and $\hat{F}_j^{MA}$ are the electric anharmonicity (EA) and mechanical anharmonicity (MA) operators, respectively. These operators are defined as

$\hat{F}_j^{EA}=\frac{1}{2M_j\omega_j} \frac{\partial^2}{\partial Q_j^2}$

and

$\hat{F}_j^{MA}=-\frac{1}{2M_j\omega_j}\sum_i \frac{g_{ijj}}{M_i\omega_i^2} \frac{\partial}{\partial Q_i}$

By substituting a relevant expression for the intermolecular interaction potential into the WCA expression for $\Delta\omega_j^{WCA}$, one can derive the vibrational frequency shift based on the specific theoretical potential model under consideration.

== Semiempirical approaches ==
While several rigorous theories for vibrational solvatochromism based on physical approximations have been proposed, these sophisticated models often necessitate extensive quantum chemistry calculations performed at elevated levels of precision with a large basis set. Current electronic structure simulation methods fall short in providing vibrational frequencies directly comparable to experimentally measured frequency shifts, especially when they are on the order of a few wavenumbers.

To accurately calculate coefficients in vibrational solvatochromism expressions, researchers frequently turn to employing multivariate leastsquare fitting. This technique involves fitting a sufficiently extensive set of training data obtained from quantum chemistry calculations of vibrational frequency shifts for numerous clusters containing a solute and multiple solvent molecules.

An early approach aimed to express the solvation-induced vibrational frequency shift in terms of the solvent electric potentials evaluated at distributed atomic sites on the target solute molecule. This method involves calculating the solvent electric potentials at these specific solute sites through the utilization of atomic partial charges from surrounding solvent molecules. The vibrational frequency shift of the solute molecule, denoted as $\Delta\omega_j(\mathbf Q)$, for the jth vibrational mode can be represented as

$\Delta\omega_j(\mathbf Q)=\omega_j(\mathbf Q)-\omega_{j0}=\sum_{k=1}^N b_{jk}\phi_k(\mathbf Q)$

Here, $\omega_j(\mathbf Q)$ represents the vibrational frequency of the jth normal mode in solution, $\omega_{j0}$ signifies the vibrational frequency in the gas phase, N denotes the number of distributed sites on the solute molecule, $\phi_k(\mathbf Q)$ denotes the solvent electric potential at the kth site of the solute molecule, and $b_{jk}$ are the parameters to be determined through least-square fitting to a training database comprising clusters containing a solute and multiple solvent molecules. This method provides a means to quantify the impact of solvation on the vibrational frequencies of the solute molecule.

Another widely used model for characterizing vibrational solvatochromic frequency shifts involves expressing the frequency shift in terms of solvent electric fields evaluated at distributed sites on the target solute molecule.

== Developments ==
Vibrational spectroscopic maps have been developed for a diverse range of vibrational modes, including various molecular systems and functional groups. Some of the notable vibrational modes include:

- Amide I mode of NMA (N-Methylacetamide)
- Amide I mode of peptide molecules
- Amide I vibration of isotope-labeled proteins
- Amide II vibration
- Nitrile (CN) stretch
- Thiocyanato (SCN) stretch
- Selenothiocyanato (SeCN) stretch
- Azido (N3) stretch
- Carbonmonoxy (CO) stretch
- Ester carbonyl (O-C=O) stretch
- Carbonate carbonyl (C=O) stretch
- Water OH and OD stretch
- C-D stretch
- S=O stretch
- Phosphate (PO2) stretch
- Nucleic acid base modes
- OH and OD stretch mode in alcohols
- Water bending mode
