= Wilhelm Lenz =

German physicist

Wilhelm Lenz (February 8, 1888, in Frankfurt am Main – April 30, 1957, in Hamburg) was a German physicist, most notable for his invention of the Ising model (named after his student, Ernst Ising), and for his application of the Laplace–Runge–Lenz vector to the old quantum mechanical treatment of hydrogen-like atoms.

== Biography ==
In 1906, Lenz graduated from the Klinger-Oberralschule, a non-classical secondary school in Frankfurt, and went to study mathematics and physics at the University of Göttingen. From 1908 to 1911, Lenz studied under Arnold Sommerfeld, at the Ludwig-Maximilians-Universität München, and he was granted his doctorate on March 2, 1911. Upon graduation, he stayed on at the university, became Sommerfeld’s assistant on April 1, 1911, and he completed his Habilitation on February 20, 1914, becoming a Privatdozent on April 4, 1914. During World War I, he served as a radio operator in France and was awarded the Iron Cross Second Class in 1916. From September 30, 1920, he was again an assistant to Sommerfeld at the Ludwig-Maximilians-Universität München’s Institute of Theoretical Physics, and he was appointed to the title and rank of extraordinarius professor at the university, on November 11, 1920. On December 1, 1920, he became an extraordinarius professor at the University of Rostock. From 1921, until his retirement in 1956, he was at the University of Hamburg, as ordinarius professor of theoretical physics and director of the Institute of Theoretical Physics.

The formation of the new chair and institute for theoretical physics at Hamburg was a result of advances being made in Germany on atomic physics and quantum mechanics and the personal intervention of Sommerfeld, who helped many of his students get such professorships.

At Hamburg, Lenz trained Ernst Ising and J. Hans D. Jensen; his assistants there included Wolfgang Pauli, Pascual Jordan, and Albrecht Unsöld. Together with Pauli and Otto Stern, Lenz built up the institute into an international center for nuclear physics. They maintained close scientific and personal exchanges with the institutes for theoretical physics at the Ludwig-Maximilians-Universität München (Sommerfeld), the University of Göttingen (Max Born), and the University of Copenhagen (Niels Bohr).

When Lenz retired in 1956, he was succeeded by Harry Lehmann.

== Books ==
- Wilhelm Lenz Einführungsmathematik für Physiker (Verlagsanstalt Wolfenbüttel, 1947)
