= Icing =

Icing may refer to:

== Science and technology ==
- Atmospheric icing, when water droplets freeze on objects they contact
  - Icing (aeronautics), formation of icing on aircraft
- Icing (nautical), sea spray that freezes upon contact with ships
- Aufeis, or icing, a sheet-like mass of frozen groundwater

== Sports ==
- Icing (ice hockey), an infraction
- Icing the kicker, a tactic in gridiron football

== Other uses ==
- Icing (album), by Cherubs, 1992
- Icing (behavior), or ghosting, ending contact and communication without warning
- Icing (food), a sweet glaze made of sugar, usually on baked goods
- Icing (game), a drinking game and Internet meme
- Icing, a jewelry and accessories retailer owned by Claire's

== See also ==
- Cryotherapy
- Ice
- Ising (surname)
