= Iced! =

2008 video game

- Developers: GarageGames; Breakthrough
- Designers: Heidi J. Boisvert; Natalia Rodriguez
- Engine: Torque
- Platforms: Windows, macOS
- Release: January 2008
- Genre: Life simulation
- Mode: Single-player

ICED! I Can End Deportation is a role-playing video game in which the player takes on the role of an illegal immigrant. The purpose of the game is to educate players about immigration and impact public opinion about immigration issues. The target demographics for the game include high school and college students. The game was developed with the Torque game engine. It is available for free on Microsoft Windows and macOS. As of October 2008, the game received about 110,000 downloads.

It was developed by GarageGames and Breakthrough (a human rights organization) and launched in 2008. The game was created and designed by Heidi Boisvert and Natalia Rodriguez. The name plays off of United States Immigration and Customs Enforcement (ICE). The game puts the player in the role of an immigrant in the United States, with five player character options. It portrays the limits on immigrants' rights which were a result of immigration laws passed in 1996. Players must avoid deportation or incarceration; other endings include voluntary deportation or attaining citizenship. The player must answer myth-or-fact questions about immigration policy correctly to avoid detention; they can also engage in community service. The characters in the game were based on real situations. Aspects of the game were also inspired by the Grand Theft Auto video game series.

The game was featured in Teen Second Life. ICED has been a part of school curricula for better student understanding of legal and human rights issues. High school students in New York City, detained immigrants, and immigration lawyers were consulted for the development of the game. A questionnaire by the Center for Children & Technology suggested the game was effective in educating its audience on these topics.
