= Joseph L. McCauley =

Joseph L. McCauley (born 1943) is Professor of Physics at the University of Houston. He was Lars Onsager's last graduate student.

His main research fields are economics and finance (econophysics), nonlinear dynamics, and statistical physics. He has also published papers on the theory of superfluids, quantum theory of vortices, cosmology, porous media, critical phenomena, and science wars.

McCauley predicted a Dollar crisis in April, 2007, this is described in chapter 9 of his 2009 book Dynamics of Markets.

He serves on the Advisory Board of the Econophysics Forum and as an editor of The International Review of Financial Analysis.

== Bibliography ==
McCauley has written four books published by Cambridge University Press:

- Chaos, Dynamics, and Fractals: An Algorithmic Approach to Deterministic Chaos (1993). ISBN 0-521-46747-0
- Classical Mechanics: Transformations, Flows, Integrable and Chaotic Dynamics (1997) . ISBN 0-521-57882-5
- Dynamics of Markets: Econophysics and Finance (2004). ISBN 0-521-03628-3
- Dynamics of Markets: The New Financial Economics (2009). ISBN 978-0-521-42962-7
- Stochastic Calculus and Differential Equations for Physics and Finance (2013). ISBN 978-0-521-76340-0

and also

- Hydrodynamics of Speed on the Water; Surface Piercing Propellers and Fast Boats, kdp 2020 ISBN 9798616305626
