= Geetanjali (disambiguation) =

Gitanjali is a collection of poems by Indian poet Rabindranath Tagore.

Gitanjali, Geetanjali or Geethanjali (Devanagari:गीतांजलि) may also refer to:

== Film and television ==
- Geethanjali (1985 film), a Tamil film
- Geethanjali (1989 film), a Telugu film
- Geetanjali (1993 film), a Hindi film
- Geethanjali (2014 film), a Telugu film
- Geethaanjali, a 2013 Malayalam film
- Geethanjali (2008 TV series), a Tamil-language soap opera
- Geethanjali (2023 TV series), a Telugu-language soap opera

== People ==
- Geetanjali (actress), Telugu film actress
- Gitanjali (given name), an Indian feminine given name (including a list of persons with the name)

== Others ==
- Gitanjali Literary Prize, a Franco-Indian literary award
- Gitanjali (Ceylonese newspaper), a defunct Ceylonese newspaper
- Geetanjali Enclave, a colony in Delhi
- Gitanjali Express, an express train service between Kolkata and Mumbai
- Gitanjali Group, a jewelry retailer
- Gitanjali metro station, a station of the Kolkata metro
