= Sanjay Oak =

Indian surgeon

Sanjay Narahari Oak
- Born: 24 November 1959 (age 66); Mumbai, Maharashtra
- Education: Government Medical College, Miraj,
- Medical career
- Profession: Surgeon, Hospital Administration
- Institutions: Prince Aly Khan Hospital, Mumbai & Aga Khan Health Services India, (CEO), Padmashree D. Y. Patil University, Navi Mumbai (Vice-Chancellor), K. E. M. Hospital (Ex-Dean), T. N. Medical College (Ex-Dean); Medical Education and Major Hospitals, M.C.G.M. (Director)
- Sub-specialties: Paediatric Surgery
- Awards: B. C. Roy Award for development of Laparoscopic Surgery in Paediatrics

Dr. Sanjay Oak is an Indian surgeon, specialised in the field of Paediatric Surgery and Laparoscopy. He was former dean of Seth G. S. Medical College and King Edward Memorial Hospital in Mumbai, Maharashtra, India and an elected Fellow of the National Academy of Medical Sciences.

He has served as Director of Medical Education and Major Hospitals for medical colleges and hospitals under the Municipal Corporation of Mumbai. He writes in Marathi and contributes a weekly column.

Dr Sanjay N. Oak assumed charge as a Vice Chancellor of University Padmashree Dr D Y Patil Vidyapeeth, Navi Mumbai from October 2012.

Dr Oak worked as CEO of Prince Aly Khan Hospital, Mumbai and Aga Khan Health Services, India for 4 years.

Recently appointed as the Chairman of Task force for COVID-19 in Maharashtra.

Dr Sanjay Oak now works as Director Professional Services and Project Management at Kaushalya (Thane), UAIMS Sangli and SVKM Shirpur hospitals.
