= Mann ke Manjeeré =

Mann ke Manjeeré Campaign by Breakthrough
- Founded: 2000
- Type: Global Human Rights Organization Campaign
- Purpose: Human Rights, Domestic Abuse, Women's Rights
- Location: India, United States
- Website: http://breakthrough.tv/

Mann ke Manjeeré was an album, music video, and ultimately an entire campaign created by human rights organization Breakthrough which promoted women's rights. Breakthrough was launched with Mann ke Manjeeré: An Album of Women's Dreams, which won the 2001 National Screen Award in India for best music video. The full campaign, focused on promoting women's rights and bringing attention to domestic violence, is based on the music video and album of the same name. The aesthetically and emotionally powerful music video was shot by Shoojit Sircar and Gary and tells the true story of Shameem Pathan, who courageously broke out of her abusive marriage and became a truck driver to support herself and her child away from her violent husband. The album features five songs by Shubha Mudgal, composed by Shantanu Moitra, with lyrics by Prasoon Joshi. The record was released through Virgin records. Mita Vashisht stars in the music video, which was viewed by over 20 million people worldwide. The Hindu described the impact of Mann ke Manjeeré saying, "Mann ke Manjeeré has made a breakthrough by claiming public space for women's aspirations."

== Awards and recognition ==
Best Indipop Music Video—Screen Awards (Mann Ke Manjeere), 2001

Best Cinematography—U Judge It! Film Festival (Mann Ke Manjeere), 2003

Link TV Award for Best Music Video (Mann ke Manjeere and Babul), 2005

== Citations ==
http://www.breakthrough.tv/learn/campaign/mann-ke-manjeer%C3%A9
