= Ernst Ising =

German physicist (1900–1998)

- Born: 10 May 1900; Cologne, Rhine, German Empire
- Died: 11 May 1998 (aged 98); Peoria, Illinois, U.S.
- Education: University of Hamburg
- Known for: Ising model
- Spouse: Johanna "Jane" Ising
- Scientific career
- Fields: Physics
- Workplaces: University of Hamburg; Bradley University
- Thesis: Contribution to the Theory of Ferromagnetism (1924)
- Doctoral advisor: Wilhelm Lenz

Ernst Ising (German: [ˈiːzɪŋ]; May 10, 1900 – May 11, 1998) was a German physicist, who is best remembered for the development of the Ising model. He was a professor of physics at Bradley University until his retirement in 1976.

== Life ==
Ernst Ising was born in Cologne in 1900. Ernst Ising's parents were the merchant Gustav Ising and his wife Thekla Löwe. After school, he studied physics and mathematics at the University of Göttingen and University of Hamburg. In 1922, he began researching ferromagnetism under the guidance of Wilhelm Lenz. He earned a Ph.D. in physics from the University of Hamburg in 1924 when he published his doctoral thesis (an excerpt or a summary of his doctoral thesis was published as an article in a scientific journal in 1925 and this has led many to believe that he published his full thesis in 1925). His doctoral thesis studied a problem suggested by his teacher, Wilhelm Lenz. He investigated the special case of a linear chain of magnetic moments, which are only able to take two positions, "up" and "down", and which are coupled by interactions between nearest neighbors. Mainly through following studies by Rudolf Peierls, Hendrik Kramers, Gregory Wannier and Lars Onsager the model proved to be successful explaining phase transitions between ferromagnetic and paramagnetic states.

After earning his doctorate, Ernst Ising worked for a short time in business before becoming a teacher, in Salem, Strausberg and Crossen, among other places. In 1930, he married the economist Dr. Johanna Ehmer (later known as Jane Ising). As a young German–Jewish scientist, Ising was barred from teaching and researching when Hitler came to power in 1933. In 1934, he found a position, first as a teacher and then as headmaster, at a Jewish school in Caputh near Potsdam for Jewish students who had been thrown out of public schools. Ernst and his wife lived in Caputh near the famous summer residence of the Einstein family. In 1938, the school in Caputh was destroyed by the Nazis, and in 1939 the Isings fled to Luxembourg, where Ising earned money as a shepherd and railroad worker. After the German Wehrmacht occupied Luxembourg, Ernst Ising was forced to work for the army. In 1947, the Ising family emigrated to the United States. Though he became professor of physics at Bradley University in Peoria, Illinois, he never published again. Ising died at his home in Peoria in 1998, just one day after his 98th birthday.

== Work ==
The Ising model is defined on a discrete collection of variables called spins, which can take on the value 1 or −1. The spins $S_i$ interact in pairs, with energy that has one value when the two spins are the same, and a second value when the two spins are different.

The energy of the Ising model is defined to be
$$E = -\sum_{i<j} J_{ij} S_i S_j,$$
where the sum counts each pair of spins only once. Notice that the product of spins is either +1 if the two spins are the same (aligned), or −1 if they are different (anti-aligned). J is half the difference in energy between the two possibilities. Magnetic interactions seek to align spins relative to one another. Spins become randomized when thermal energy is greater than the strength of the interaction.

For each pair, if

$J_{ij} > 0$, the interaction is called ferromagnetic;
$J_{ij} < 0$, the interaction is called antiferromagnetic;
$J_{ij} = 0$, the spins are noninteracting.

A ferromagnetic interaction tends to align spins, and an antiferromagnetic tends to antialign them.

The spins can be thought of as living on a graph, where each node has exactly one spin, and each edge connects two spins with a nonzero value of J. If all the J values are equal, it is convenient to measure energy in units of J. Then a model is completely specified by the graph and the sign of J.

The antiferromagnetic one-dimensional Ising model has the energy function
$$E = \sum_i S_i S_{i+1},$$
where i runs over all the integers. This links each pair of nearest neighbors.

In his 1924 Ph.D. thesis, Ising solved the model for the 1D case. In one dimension, the solution admits no phase transition. On the basis of this result, he incorrectly concluded that his model does not exhibit phase transition in any dimension.

It was only in 1949 that Ising knew the importance his model attained in scientific literature, 25 years after his Ph.D. thesis. Today, each year, about 800 papers are published that use the model to address problems in such diverse fields as neural networks, protein folding, biological membranes and social behavior. Analysis of Google Scholar results shows exponential increase in the occurrence of "Ising model" in paper titles, with a doubling period of approximately ten years, reaching 1800 occurrences in 2025.

The Ising model had significance as a historical step towards recurrent neural networks. Glauber in 1963 studied the Ising model evolving in time, as a process towards equilibrium (Glauber dynamics), adding in the component of time. Shun'ichi Amari in 1972 proposed to modify the weights of an Ising model by Hebbian learning rule as a model of associative memory, adding in the component of learning. This was popularized as the Hopfield network (1982).

== See also ==
- Lattice density functional theory (1925) solution to the one-dimensional (1D) lattice problem
