= America 2040 =

1986–88 book series by Hugh Zachary

- Cover of the first novel in the series
- America 2040 (1986); America 2040: The Golden World (1986); America 2040: City In The Mist (1987); America 2040: The Return (1988); America 2040: The Star Explorer (1988)
- Author: Hugh Zachary as Evan Innes
- Country: United States
- Language: English
- Genre: science fiction
- Publisher: Random House Publishing Group, Bantam Books
- Published: 1986 - 1988
- No. of books: 5

America 2040 (1986-1988) is a science fiction book series by Evan Innes, a pen name for Hugh Zachary.

Locked in a struggle with the Soviets and on the brink of nuclear annihilation, the United States sends a group of men and women on a mission into the uncharted realms of outer space.

== Summaries ==
=== America 2040 ===
Dexter Hamilton was born in North Carolina in 1987 until he became governor,senator and the President of the United States in 2033 and he is the first American President to travel to the Soviet Union to meet the Soviet Premier Yuri Kolchak to talk over weapons of war along with his Secretary of State,George Maxwell until these two men are accompanied by Soviet General Theresa Pulaski after Summit Meeting in Soviet Union concludes,Hamilton and Maxwell go back to Washington DC and they decide to use Project Lightstep and rhenium fuel for ships heading to space in the near future.

Eight years later in 2040,the shuttle known as Spirit of America is preparing to launch to find the new frontier. Shuttle commander Duncan Rodrick along with his crew Jackie Garvey, Rocky Miller and his wife Mandy along with Pat Renfro, Jack Purdy and his wife Dinah are heading for the frontier while Clay Girard and his dog, Jumper want to be part of this until their deaths.

=== America 2040: The Golden World ===
The second chapter begins after the Spirit of America's journey with three crew members killed are Dick Stanton, Dinah Purdy and Pat Renfro at the hands of supernatural occurrences inside the ship until they find a new planet Omega which is similar to Earth and settle on the new planet and name various geographical features after the dead crew members such as Stanton Bay, Lake Dinah and Renfro Mountains.

=== America 2040: City In The Mist ===
The third chapter continues as the citizens of the planet Omega are safe and sound while captain Duncan Rodrick and his crew find the new city of stone that was discovered by Stoner McRae until Hamilton decided to visit the new planet for the first time since he became the commander in chief.

=== America 2040: The Return ===
The fourth chapter continues as the citizens welcome Hamilton to the new planet after his new ship Free Enterprise landing on Omega

=== America 2040: The Star Explorer ===
The fifth and final chapter of the America 2040 series comes to the end as the citizens elect Dexter Hamilton as the president of Omega.

== Reception ==
Publishers Weekly called the first novel in the series "a kind of neoconservative pulp novel, overbearing and sodden".
