= Radhika Chandiramani =

Indian clinical psychologist, writer and editor

Radhika Chandiramani is the founder of TARSHI, a New Delhi–based NGO that works on issues of sexual and reproductive health and rights. She is a clinical psychologist, writer and editor. Her published works on sexuality and human rights have been covered in media and scholarly reviews. Chandiramani received the MacArthur Fellowship in the year 1995 for leadership development. She is also the recipient of the 2003 Soros Reproductive Health and Rights Fellowship from Columbia University Mailman School of Public Health.

== Education ==
Chandiramani trained in clinical psychology at the National Institute of Mental Health and Neurosciences (NIMHANS).

== Founding of TARSHI ==
Chandiramani founded TARSHI in 1996, after receiving a fellowship from the MacArthur Foundation to start a helpline on sexual and reproductive health. The helpline disseminated information, provided counselling and gave referrals for 13 years. TARSHI has since increased its scope and now implements trainings and other public education initiatives throughout South and Southeast Asia.

== Writing and publications ==
She has contributed to various anthologies on sexuality and human rights, which have been covered in media and scholarly reviews.

Chandiramani is the author of a book on feminism and sexuality called Good Times for Everyone: Sexuality Questions, Feminist Answers. The Tribune's review of the book notes: "As she explores taboos, we note that the author’s credentials are formidable... The book has responses to a wide variety of questions for inter-caste marriages, teenage sex, HIV, safer sex and speaks clearly on issues of homosexuality, lesbianism, bisexuality and the entire range that also exists."

Her work, Sexuality, Gender and Rights: Exploring Theory and Practice in South and Southeast Asia, which she also co-edited with Geetanjali Misra, is a book consisting of 15 chapters, written by notable authors who have had experience in the areas of sexuality, gender differences and women rights. Dr. Sawmya Ray of Indian Institute of Technology Guwahati writes in the scholastic review of the book: "This volume is rich in data drawn from personal narratives and case studies. All the articles are well integrated into its overarching theme". The Tribune notes in its review: "The human rights of women have been a topic of debate the world over. The right to make choices about sexuality, control over such rights and related issues are voiced regularly at international forums. The book throws light on some attempts made to recognise these rights and ensure their acceptance in society."

Chandiramani published an analysis of the demographics and impact of TARSHI's helpline in a 1998 issue of the journal Reproductive Health Matters. She is a regular contributor to TARSHI's digital magazine In Plainspeak, and she has written for Outlook India and India Today.
