= Bombay Psychiatric Society =

- Abbreviation: B.P.S.
- Formation: 1965
- Type: Private Body
- Legal status: Association
- Purpose: Education and Research
- Headquarters: Mumbai
- Location: Maharashtra, India
- Region served: City wide
- Members: Mental health Professionals
- Official language: English
- President: Dr. Kavan Lakdawala
- Website: http://bombaypsych.org/

Bombay Psychiatric Society is a private organisation of mental health professionals that include Psychiatrists, Psychologists, Special Educators, Social Workers and Psychiatric Nurses, in the city of Mumbai (previously Bombay), Maharashtra, India.

== The foundation ==
The society began functioning formally almost 45 years ago with meetings at the late capt.(Dr.) K.A.J. Lalkaka's residence at Kemp's corner. Guest speakers, discussions on interesting cases and academic subjects were the content of their short meetings. From these meetings sprang the concept of holding luncheon meetings at the K.E.M Hospital hosted jointly by Dr. N.S. Vahia and Dr. V.N. Bagadia .

As the attendance increased the meetings became regular monthly meetings with all 4 medical colleges i.e., Topiwala National Medical College, Seth G. S. Medical College, Lokmanya Tilak Medical College and Sir J. J. Medical college. Later Invitations were being extended to all Psychiatrists and Psychologists in private and non- teaching set-ups. Around 1965 it was felt the body was now strong enough and the Bombay Psychiatric Society was formally named and constitution adopted.

At the first general body meeting Dr. Lalkaka was elected president and Dr. K. R. Saraf became the first Hon. Secretary of the Society.

BPS celebrates its 50th year in 2015–16. A host of programs showcasing the work of mental health professionals were organized in Mumbai as a prelude to the golden jubilee year.

The golden jubilee year started with a theme of "taking psychiatry ahead". Justice AP Shah, Chairman, Law Commission, Govt of India; Mr ST Ramesh, DGP Karnataka & Chairman Alcoholics Anonymous, India; Svati & Satyajeet Bhatkal, Directors Satyameva Jayate graced the function.

== Work ==
The organisation has played an important role time to time in research and awareness work in the city. Various workshops and seminars are held regularly and a monthly meeting is held in all the medical colleges in the city where unique cases are discussed and budding psychiatrists are given a chance to show their talent while presenting cases.

After a spate of suicides by students in 2010, BPS had initiated a campaign along with additional municipal commissioner Manisha Mhaiskar, KEM Hospital dean Dr Sanjay Oak and the BMC’s education department. The Bombay Psychiatric Society by taking help from the local psychiatrists and counselors, residing near the school areas aim to build a bridge between local mental health professionals and the schools, where psychiatrists visit the schools to conduct workshops thus reducing the stigma or reservations in minds of teachers about taking psychiatric help for issues such as depression in students.

== Management ==
The society is managed by a core committee composed of the President, a vice-President, Secretary, Treasurer and the Executive committee members. Dr. Kavan Lakdawala is the president for this year followed by Dr. Heena Pandit-Merchant as the vice-president. Dr. Priyanka Thukral-Mahajan is the current Secretary. The new Executive Committee took over on the Annual Day that was held on 8th May 2022 at the Jio Convention Centre.
