= Indian Journal of Psychiatry =

- Discipline: Psychiatry
- Language: English
- Edited by: Sujit Sarkhel

Publication details
- Former names: Indian Journal of Neurology and Psychiatry
- History: 1949-present
- Publisher: Medknow Publications on behalf of the Indian Psychiatric Society (India)
- Frequency: Monthly
- Open access: Yes
- Impact factor: 2.983 (2021)

Standard abbreviations
- ISO 4: Indian J. Psychiatry

Indexing
- ISSN: 0019-5545
- OCLC no.: 746945928

Links
- Journal homepage; Online access; Online archive

The Indian Journal of Psychiatry is a monthly peer-reviewed open access medical journal. It is published by Medknow Publications on behalf of the Indian Psychiatric Society. It covers research in all fields of psychiatry.

== History ==
The journal was established in 1949 as the Indian Journal of Neurology and Psychiatry and obtained its present name in 1958. The editor-in-chief is Sujit Sarkhel The following persons have been editors-in-chief:

- N. N. De (1949–1951)
- L. P. Verma (1951–1958)
- A. N. Bardhan (1958–1960)
- M. R. Vachha (1961–1967)
- A. Venkoba Rao (1968–1976)
- B. B. Sethi (1977–1984)
- S. M. Channabasavanna (1985–1988)
- A. K. Agarwal (1989–1992)
- K. Kuruvilla (1993–1996)
- J. K. Trivedi (1997–2002)
- U. Goswami (2003)
- T. S. S. Rao (2004)
- N. G. Desai (2005–2006)
- T. S. S. Rao (2007-2018)
- G. Swaminath (2007)
- T. S. Sathyanarayana

== Abstracting and indexing ==
The journal is abstracted and indexed in Scopus, EBSCO databases, Expanded Academic ASAP, and InfoTrac.

== Retraction ==
In 2016, the journal retracted a 2013 supplementary paper because it plagiarized a Wikipedia article.
