= Jane Ising =

German economist (1902–2012)

Johanna "Jane" Ising (born Johanna [Hannchen] Ehmer on February 2, 1902, in Berlin; died February 2, 2012, in Matteson, Illinois) was a German-American economist.

== Life ==
Ising studied economics at the Friedrich-Wilhelm University Berlin and received her doctorate in 1926 with a thesis on "The Problem of Unemployment in England after 1920". On December 23, 1930, she married physicist Ernst Ising; they lived in Caputh, Brandenburg, next to the famous summer residence of the Einstein family. In 1938, the Jewish boarding school in Caputh, where Johanna and Ernst Ising worked as teachers, was destroyed by National Socialists; in 1939, the Isings emigrated to Luxembourg. After the German occupation of Luxembourg, Ernst Ising was forced to perform labor in the army. In 1939 their son Tom was born in Luxembourg. In 1947 they emigrated to the United States and settled in Peoria, Illinois in 1949, where the Isings taught at Bradley University. Jane Ising passed away in the early morning hours of her 110th birthday.
