= Sanctuary for Families =

U.S. non-profit organization

- Founded at: New York City, U.S.
- Type: Non-profit
- Legal status: 501(c)(3)
- Services: Social Services | Domestic Violence
- Executive Director: Hon. Judy Harris Kluger
- Website: sanctuaryforfamilies.org

Sanctuary for Families is a New York City-based non-profit organization dedicated to aiding victims of domestic violence and their children. Founded in 1984, its services include crisis intervention, emergency and transitional shelter, legal assistance and representation, adult and child counseling, and long-term follow-up care. Sanctuary for Families is also involved in extensive training, public awareness, and advocacy programs.

== Public attention ==
Sanctuary for Families receives recognition from the mayor's office of New York City and the District Attorney's office. Its pro bono legal services have attracted note in stories about the legal struggles of women who leave abusive relationships.

In Nicholson v. Williams Sanctuary for Families and public interest law firm Lansner & Kubitschek represented a successful lawsuit against the city's Administration for Children's Services. The court ruled against ACS' practice of bringing child neglect proceedings against mothers and removing children from their custody on the basis of them having "allowed" their children to witness domestic violence or their having "engaged" in domestic violence simply by being a victim of it.

In 2007, it was among over 530 New York City arts and social service institutions to receive part of a $20 million (~$29.1 million in 2024) grant from the Carnegie Corporation, which was made possible through a donation by New York City mayor Michael Bloomberg.

An Instagram political activist, Emily Amick, started her career at the non-profit and currently works as a human rights lawyer.
