= Indira Sharma =

Indian psychiatrist

Indira Sharma is an Indian psychiatrist specialising in child psychiatry and women's mental health. She is a professor and head of the psychiatry department at Banaras Hindu University. In January 2013, she was elected president of the Indian Psychiatric Society.
