= New York State Coalition Against Domestic Violence =

The New York State Coalition Against Domestic Violence, or NYSCADV, is a statewide nonprofit organization dedicated to reducing domestic violence in New York, ensuring that services focus on victim safety and offender accountability. It was founded in 1978.

NYSCADV currently unites over 135 domestic violence programs and shelters in cities and regions across New York. NYSCADV works to do policy analysis, training and technical assistance, and education, and is dedicated to helping local programs establish, promote and expand anti-violence education, prevention, organizing, advocacy and direct services.

NYSCADV also encourages and assists in the development of policies that assist victims of domestic violence, address the perpetrators of violence and change the social atmosphere of violence.

According to a 1991 article by Kimberlé Williams Crenshaw, feminists of color reported struggles with the NYSCADV over "practices that marginalized the interests of women of color".
