= Geetanjali Misra =

- Geetanjali Misra at AWID 2016
- Occupations: Advocate, activist and writer
- Website: www.creaworld.org

Geetanjali Misra is the co-founder and executive director of Creating Resources for Empowerment in Action, a women's rights and non-governmental organization based in New Delhi. Geetanjali has worked at an activist, grant-making and policy levels on issues of sexuality, reproductive health, gender, human rights and gender-based violence. Presently, she is a member of the Amnesty International Gender Task Force, the Spotlight Civil Society reference group and a board member of Astraea Lesbian Foundation for Justice.

== Education ==
She holds master’s degrees in International Affairs from Columbia University, US, and in Economics from Syracuse University, US.

== Career ==
Misra has taught as an adjunct professor on the intersection of LGBT issues, sexual rights and public health at the Columbia University Mailman School of Public Health. Before joining CREA, she was program officer for Sexuality and Reproductive Health at the Ford Foundation in New Delhi and supported non-governmental organizations in India, Nepal, and Sri Lanka, working on sexual and reproductive health and rights. She also co-founded SAKHI for South Asian Women in 1989, a non-profit organization in New York, committed to ending violence against women of South Asian origin.

Formerly, she was Chair of the Boards of Reproductive Health Matters (UK), a global peer reviewed journal on sexual and reproductive health and rights and Mama Cash (the Netherlands). She was a board member of FHI 360 (USA) and also served as president of the board of the AWID. In the past, she held several key advisory roles such as being a Member of Cordaid’s Expert Advisory Group (the Netherlands), served as a core member of the Action Plus Coalition for Rights, Education and Care in HIV/AIDS (India), and was regional and global advisor for Global Fund for Women (USA).

She writes on issues of sexuality, gender, and rights. In 2005, she co-authored Sexuality, Gender and Rights: Exploring Theory and Practice in South and Southeast Asia (SAGE Publications) with Radhika Chandiramani. The book covers sexuality and rights in South Asia, from education and health services to transsexuality, AIDS concerns and treatment, and advocacy. Misra has also written a number of academic papers on the rights of sex workers in Asia, including Protecting the Rights of Sex Workers: The Indian Experience, published in 2000 in the Harvard School of Public Health, Health and Human Rights journal. She is also author of ‘The Power of Movements’ published by AWID.
