= Breakthrough (human rights) =

Human rights organization

Breakthrough is a global human rights organization working to end violence against women and girls.

== Organization and mission ==
Based in India and the United States, Breakthrough runs multimedia campaigns addressing global issues including violence against women, sexuality and HIV/AIDS, and immigrant rights and racial justice. The organization's stated goal is a world in which all people enjoy their human rights and live with dignity, equality, and justice, which it seeks to achieve by making violence and discrimination against women and girls unacceptable.

Its stated mission is to prevent violence against women and girls by transforming the norms and cultures that enable it, in part by building a network of supporters it calls the Breakthrough Generation. Working out of centers in India and the U.S., Breakthrough creates multimedia tools and programs, ranging from short animations to long-term leadership training.

== History ==
Indian-American human rights activist and cultural entrepreneur Mallika Dutt founded Breakthrough in 2000 with Mann ke Manjeeré: An Album of Women's Dreams, an album and music video on women's rights. Launched as an experiment in using pop culture and media for social justice, Mann ke Manjeeré remained on the Indian pop charts for six weeks and won the 2001 National Screen Award in India for best music video.

On using pop culture tools to promote human rights, Dutt has said, "After working inside the global human rights movement for most of my professional life, the experience of seeing the same faces at every meeting, policy brief or conference had left me frustrated ... The more I thought about it, the more convinced I'd become that media, art and popular culture could express [human rights] values in new ways for new audiences."

Dutt served as president and CEO through March 2017. As of July 2017, the president and CEO was Sohini Bhattacharya.

== Campaigns and initiatives ==
=== Bell Bajao! (Ring the Bell!) ===
Developed in pro bono partnership with Ogilvy & Mather, Bell Bajao is a domestic violence awareness campaign that calls on men and boys to act as partners in ending violence against women. Since 2008, Bell Bajao has reached more than 130 million people in India through a series of television advertisements.

Breakthrough's Bell Bajao (Ring the Bell) is the organization's largest campaign. It has called on people around the world to "ring the bell" against domestic violence. The multimedia campaign, which received a Cannes Silver Lion, shows men ringing a doorbell to interrupt overheard violence, presenting domestic abuse as an issue that concerns everyone and men as partners rather than only as perpetrators. Community workshops and leadership trainings use games, street theater, and other cultural tools to engage family members as advocates for women's rights. Bell Bajao's tools and tactics have been adapted by individuals and organizations in many countries, leading to the campaign's global expansion, Ring the Bell.

On March 8, 2013, Breakthrough launched Ring the Bell, a global extension of its Bell Bajao campaign. The global campaign was launched in partnership with public figures including Sir Patrick Stewart, singer and songwriter Michael Bolton, former NFL player and activist Don McPherson, then- Mayor of Dallas Mike Rawlings, comedian and political commentator Dean Obeidallah and spoken word artist Darnell L. Moore. The campaign was also supported by Sir Richard Branson, Bollywood actor Amitabh Bachchan, former Under-Secretary-General and Executive Director of UN Women Michelle Bachelet, producer and director Joe Wright, musician Anoushka Shankar, and Bollywood actor Rahul Bose.

=== Nation Against Early Marriage ===
Early marriage is a widespread problem in India and is linked to an array of other gender-based issues, including low female education levels, domestic violence, teen maternity, and female disempowerment. Nation Against Early Marriage aims to address these challenges by eradicating early marriage through the promotion of what it considers healthy gender norms, male-female relationships, and acceptance of female sexuality.

The program is implemented in two states: in Ranchi and Hazaribagh, Jharkhand, and in Gaya, Bihar, all located in northern India. The program consists of mass media intervention, block-level training with NGOs, CBOs, self-help groups, and youth groups, and community mobilizations.

Breakthrough produced public service announcement videos about the harms of early marriage. These Hindi-language videos urge fathers to reconsider whether early marriage is best for their daughters. Breakthrough also produced mini-documentaries about girls who were confronted with early marriage, which are posted on Breakthrough's website.

== Other campaigns and initiatives ==
=== Deport The Statue ===
In 2013, Breakthrough partnered with The Yes Men to reach new supporters for women's and immigrants' rights. The satirical Deport the Statue campaign called for the deportation of the Statue of Liberty on the premise that she lacked legal documentation for living and working in the United States. It was run by the mock organization Legals for the Preservation of American Culture (LPAC). LPAC's website, deportthestatue.us, incorporated video, text, interactive features, social media advocacy, and downloadable materials. Links on the website directed visitors to related media and to Breakthrough's Deport the Statue campaign page. That page explained the rationale behind the mock campaign and urged readers to support fair immigration reform by taking actions such as contacting their members of Congress and joining Breakthrough online and in person.

Around its launch in June 2013, Deport the Statue received wide attention from the press. Immigration reform did not pass in Congress. Breakthrough subsequently continued the campaign online and through partner events, including participation in the Bushwick Film Festival and an October event with the Illuminator for the National Day for Immigrant Dignity and Respect.

=== #ImHere ===
Breakthrough's #ImHere multimedia campaign reached over 7 million people and encouraged Americans to say "#ImHere" to promote the rights of immigrant women. Through a mix of user-generated content, targeted social media, and partnerships with artists and celebrities including Conor Oberst and Margaret Cho, the campaign sought to draw attention to what it described as the ways in which U.S. immigration policy causes violence against immigrant women. Its centerpiece, "The Call", is a short narrative film about a mother facing a difficult choice, depicting the impact of U.S. policy on the daily lives of immigrant women and families.

=== ICED - I Can End Deportation ===
ICED - I Can End Deportation is a free, downloadable 3D video game that puts players in the role of immigrants struggling to live, study, and work in the U.S.

=== America 2049 ===
America 2049 is a transmedia Facebook game that uses the platform to explore assumptions about racial justice, human rights, migration and democracy. Players assume fictional character roles in a plot that highlights human rights themes such as migration, voting and constitutional rights, trafficking, LGBT rights, labor rights, and racial profiling. Players engage with videos, graphics, microsites and social media platforms to find clues and solve puzzles to advance in the game. America 2049 also features Harold Perrineau, Victor Garber, Cherry Jones, Anthony Rapp, and Margaret Cho.

=== Restore Fairness ===
Launched in 2009, the Restore Fairness campaign is a video documentary series and blog calling on the U.S. government to uphold fair immigration and racial justice. The campaign's documentary shorts feature stories about life in the United States for immigrants and communities of color after September 11, 2001, drawing attention to the ways in which, according to the campaign, U.S. immigration policy and laws deny people fairness and due process. The documentaries, produced in partnership with civil society and human rights groups, tell the stories of men and women who, the campaign says, were humiliated because of their racial or ethnic background, inhumanely detained, abused, and separated from their families.

=== I Am This Land ===
A nationwide three-month video contest launched in 2010, I Am This Land called on young Americans to create videos about diversity, pluralism, identity, gender and sexuality, immigration, and racial justice. The contest was publicized with a coordinated, partner-driven campaign of animated mini-videos, celebrity PSAs, and social media, reaching tens of thousands of people. Visitors to iamthisland.org voted to select the top ten videos; in early 2011, a panel of judges representing the music industry, youth, and feminist advocacy chose the video they believed most effectively conveyed the value of diversity.

=== What Kind of Man Are You? ===
Developed in pro bono partnership with McCann Erickson, What Kind of Man Are You? is a multimedia campaign asking men to wear condoms to prevent the transmission of HIV/AIDS to their wives. The campaign aimed to encourage a national dialogue about a woman's right to negotiate safe sex within marriage.

=== Is This Justice? ===
Developed in pro bono partnership with advertising agency Ogilvy & Mather, Is This Justice? was a multimedia awareness campaign launched in 2007 about the stigma and discrimination faced by women, particularly widows, living with HIV/AIDS. Many women living with HIV/AIDS have been infected by their husbands or male partners, and suffer discrimination because of the disease. In India, 92% of women widowed by AIDS are forced by family members to leave home after their husband's death. This campaign sought to put a face to the issue through public service announcements, and by inviting HIV-positive women to share their stories. The campaign was produced in four languages: Hindi, English, Kannada and Marathi. The "Is This Justice" PSAs received the 2007 Radio and TV Advertising Practitioner's Association of India award for "Best Film with a Social Message" and the 2008 Bronze Abby Award in the Public Service category.

=== Mann ke Manjeeré ===
Mann ke Manjeeré is a music album that promotes women's rights. The title track and its video are based on the true story of Shameem Pathan, who left an abusive marriage and became a truck driver to support herself and her child away from her violent husband. The album features five songs by Shubha Mudgal, composed by Shantanu Moitra, with lyrics by Prasoon Joshi. The record was released through Virgin Records.

== Awards and nominations ==
- Making a Difference Award from Children's Hope India (Mallika Dutt), New York, 2013
- YO DONA International Humanitarian Award (Mallika Dutt), Madrid, 2013
- Avon Global Award for Excellence in Communications, 2012
- Games for Change Transmedia Award Nomination, 2011
- Silver Lion, Cannes Film Festival (Bell Bajao), 2010
- Gold and Silver at Goafest, (Bell Bajao), 2009
- Karmaveer Puraskar: National Award for Social Justice & Citizen Action by the Indian Confederation of NGOs, (Mallika Dutt), 2009
- American Courage Award, Asian American Justice Center (AAJC), (Mallika Dutt), 2009
- Gold Spike, Spike Asia (Ring, Ring/Bell Bajao), 2009
- Young Achiever's Award from Advertising Club of Bombay (Bell Bajao), (O &M's Ryan Mendonca), 2009
- Best Integrated Campaign of the Year, Media Abby Award at Goafest for Public Service, Appeals and Charity (Bell Bajao), 2009
- Dogooder Nonprofit Award, Best Staff-Long Form Video (Death by Detention), 2009
- South Asian Media & Marketing Association (SAMMA) Trailblazer Award (Mallika Dutt), 2008
- The Woman of Color, Woman of Courage Award (IUP Women's Studies Program) (Mallika Dutt), 2008
- Bronze at the 41st Abby Awards in the Public Service, Appeals, and Charity Category (Is This Justice), 2008
- Radio & TV Advertising Practitioner's Association of India (RAPA) Award for Best Film with a Social Message (Is This Justice?), 2007
- Clinton Global Initiative - Reducing Twin Pandemics: HIV/AIDS and Gender Based Violence, 2006
- Clinton Global Initiative - Value Families Campaign, 2006
- Award for Distinguished Service, New York University School of Law, BLAPA Alumni Association (Mallika Dutt), 2006
- Link TV Award for Best Music Video (Mann ke Manjeere and Babul), 2005
- Best Cinematography—U Judge It! Film Festival (Mann Ke Manjeere), 2003
- Best Exhibition Award to Artist—Haku Shah—India Habitat Centre (Haman Hain Ishq), 2003
- Spirit of Asian America Award—Asian American Federation of New York (Mallika Dutt), 2003
- Phoenix Award—New York Asian Women's Center (Mallika Dutt), 2002
- Best Indipop Music Video—Screen Awards (Mann Ke Manjeere), 2001
- National Citizen's Award (India) for Contribution to Women & Development (Mallika Dutt), 2001
- South Asian Women's Creative Collection (SAWCC) Annual Achievement Award for Outstanding Contributions to the South Asian Community (Mallika Dutt), 2001
