= Indian Psychiatric Society =

Professional association in India

- Abbreviation: IPS
- Predecessor: Indian Division of Royal Medico Psychological Association
- Formation: January 7, 1947; 79 years ago
- Type: Professional Association
- Professional title: Psychiatrist
- Headquarters: Gurgaon, Haryana, India
- Region served: India
- Services: Promote Mental Health
- Fields: Psychiatry; Medicine
- President: Dr Savita Malhotra
- Vice President: Dr T.S.S. Rao
- Gen Secretary: Dr Amrit Pattojoshi
- Treasurer: Dr M. Aleem Siddiqui
- Main organ: Indian Journal of Psychiatry
- Affiliations: World Psychiatric Association, World Federation for Mental Health
- Website: Official website

The Indian Psychiatric Society (IPS) is the oldest professional association of psychiatrists in India. Founded during the 34th Indian Science Congress, IPS replaced the Indian division of the Royal Medico-Psychological Association.

Savita Malhotra from Chandigarh is the current President of the Indian Psychiatric Society.

Amrit Pattojoshi from Bhubaneswar, Odisha is the Hon. General Secretary.

== Founding ==
In 1929, Col. Berkeley Hill founded the Indian Association for Mental Hygiene, affiliated with the National Council for Mental Health Hygiene in Great Britain. The Association ceased to function after yew years.

Later, Dr Banarasi Das campaigned for the Indian division of the Royal Medico-Psychological Association. The division was formed in 1939 and functioned till 1947.

On 7 January 1947, during the 34th Indian Science Congress, the founding members decided to dissolve the Indian division of the Royal Medico-Psychological Association and establish the Indian Psychiatric Society. Ajita Chakraborty was elected president of the society in 1976, thereby becoming the first woman to serve as president of the society.

== Objectives ==
Indian Psychiatric Society aims to promote and advance the field of Psychiatry. The Society promotes research in the field of psychiatry and mental health. It formulates and advises on the standard of education and training for those involved in psychiatry and mental health.

The Society promotes the prevention and treatment of psychiatric disorders and improves the general mental health of people. It raises awareness about mental health, including mental health matters concerning the Country. The society safeguards the interest of psychiatrists and fellow professionals in India.

== Organisations ==
No.	Zones	States
1	Central Zone	Chhattisgarh, Madhya Pradesh, Uttar Pradesh and Uttarakhand
2	Eastern Zone	Assam, Bihar, Jharkhand, West Bengal, Manipur, Meghalaya, Odisha, Sikkim and Tripura
3	Northern Zone	Chandigarh, Haryana, Himachal Pradesh, Jammu and Kashmir, Ladakh, Punjab and Rajasthan
4	South Zone	Andhra Pradesh, Karnataka, Kerala, Puducherry, Tamil Nadu and Telangana.
5	Western Zone	Goa, Gujarat and Maharashtra.

== Publication ==
=== Indian Journal of Psychiatry ===
On behalf of the Indian Psychiatric Society, Medknow Publications publishes a monthly peer-reviewed open-access medical journal Indian Journal of Psychiatry. The current editor of the journal is Dr Sujit Sarkhel

=== Eastern Journal of Psychiatry ===
Eastern Journal of Psychiatry is a peer-reviewed medical journal published by the East Zone of the Indian Psychiatric Society.

=== Indian Journal of Behavioral Sciences ===
Indian Journal of Behavioral Sciences is a peer-reviewed medical journal published by the Central Zone of the Indian Psychiatric Society.

=== Indian Journal of Psychological Medicine ===
Indian Journal of Psychological Medicine is a peer-reviewed medical journal published by the South Zone of the Indian Psychiatric Society.

=== Journal of Mental Health and Human Behaviour ===
Journal of Mental Health and Human Behaviour is a peer-reviewed medical journal published by the North Zone of the Indian Psychiatric Society.

== Past presidents and secretaries ==
A complete list of past presidents is available on the official website of the society.

Year	President	Secretary
2016	K. S. Jacob	N. N. Raju
2017	Ajit Bhide	N. N. Raju
2018	Rakesh Chadda	N. N. Raju
2019	Arvind Brahma	Vinay Kumar
2020	P. K. Dalal	Vinay Kumar
2021	Gautam Saha	T. S. S. Rao
2022	N. N. Raju	Arabinda Brahma
2023	Vinay Kumar	Arabinda Brahma
2024	Laxmikant Rathi	Amrit Pattojoshi
2025	Savita Malhotra	Amrit Pattojoshi
2026	T. S. Sathyanarayana Rao	Amrit Pattojoshi

== Positions ==
=== LGBTQA ===
==== Rebuttal of Former President ====
On 19 January 2014, Dr Indira Sharma, the former president of the Indian Psychiatric Society, expressed her opinion that homosexuality is unnatural. The Times of India reported that towards the end of her term as the President, Dr Indira Sharma voiced similar views in an Indian Psychiatric Society panel discussing the re-criminalisation of homosexuality in India.

President Dr T V Asokan and General Secretary Dr N N Raju issued a joint statement clarifying the official position of the society that homosexuality is not a psychiatric disorder. The joint statement pointed out the lack of evidence to support the view that homosexuality is unnatural.

==== Support for decriminalisation ====
As the Supreme Court of India was hearing a case about decriminalising homosexuality, the Indian Psychiatric Society issued a statement supporting the decriminalisation on 2 July 2018.

The Society pointed out that American Psychiatric Association removed homosexuality from the Diagnostic and Statistical Manual of Mental Disorders in 1973. The World Health Organization removed homosexuality from the International Classification of Diseases in 1992. The Society stated that homosexuality is a natural variation of human sexuality. The Society pointed out the lack of scientific evidence to support conversion therapy and the evidence that conversion therapy leads to stigmatisation and low-self esteem.

==== Opposition to Conversion Therapy ====
On 11 June 2020, pointing to the 2nd July 2018 Positional Statement, the Indian Psychiatric Society reiterated that homosexuality is not a psychiatric disorder. Conversion Therapies are based on the erroneous premise that sexual orientations are diseases. The Society pointed out the lack of evidence to support the efficiency of the Conversion Therapies. The statement disapproved of the Conversion Therapies and urged mental health professionals to refrain from providing such services.

==== Support for Marriage Equality ====
As the Supreme Court of India was hearing cases on marriage equality, the Indian Psychiatric Society issued a statement supporting marriage equality on 9 April 2023. The Society reiterated that LGBTQA identities are natural variations within the range of human sexuality. Stating that there is no evidence to support the exclusion of LGBTQA people from marriage, the Society cautioned that discrimination leads to mental health issues.

==== Support for Same-sex Adoption ====
As the Supreme Court of India was hearing cases on same-sex adoptions, the Indian Psychiatric Society issued a statement supporting adoption rights for LGBTQA people on 9 April 2023. The Society acknowledged that the children of same-sex parents might experience discrimination and stigma and urged the sensitise families, schools and communities to prevent stigma and discrimination.

== Controversy ==
=== Dr Indira Sharma ===
==== Early marriage to curb sexual crimes ====
During her term as the president of the Indian Psychiatric Society, Dr Indira Sharma suggested early marriage as a way to curb sexual crimes. The statement caused Indian psychiatrists to oppose her view. The members raised concerns about uploading her speech on the society's official website, as required by the rules. Dr T S Sathyanarayana Rao, the editor of the Indian Journal of Psychiatry, suggested that the Society examine a written article supporting her claims before uploading her speech. Dr Indira Sharma insisted the difference of opinion should be respected.

==== Homosexuality is unnatural ====
In the days following the end of Dr Indira Sharma's term as the president of the Indian Psychiatric Society, the Times of India interviewed her about the views she expressed during the panel discussion on the decision of the Supreme Court to overturn the ruling of Delhi High Court and re-criminalise homosexuality. She confirmed the reports that she believes homosexuality is unnatural. Following her interview, the current president and general secretary of the society issued a joint statement clarifying the official position of the society. The statement said there is no evidence to support the claims that homosexuality is a psychiatric disorder.

== See also ==
- World Psychiatric Association
- World Federation for Mental Health
