= Kohli =

Kohli may refer to either of two unrelated surnames of Indian and Swiss-German origins. The Swiss-German surname can also be spelled Köhli and is a diminutive of a given name and the word for 'helmet' in Old Norse, kollir. The Indian surname is of unknown origin, but it is most widely associated with the Khatri community.

Notable people with the surname include:

== Academia ==
- Atul Kohli, professor of politics and international affairs at Princeton University
- Daman Singh (born 1963), Indian author
- Gursharan Kaur (born 1937), Indian historian, professor and author
- Upinder Singh (born 1958), Indian historian, professor and author
- Sita Ram Kohli, eminent historian, researcher, and author in the fields of Punjabi and Sikh history

== Administration ==
- Ajay Kohli, American marketing theorist and former editor-in-chief of the Journal of Marketing.
- D. P. Kohli, the founder Director of the CBI, India's Central Investigation Agency
- F. C. Kohli (1924–2020), Indian industrialist and founder of Tata Consultancy Services, also known as father of Indian software industry
- Pawanexh Kohli (born 1963), Chief Executive and Advisor of India's National Centre for Cold-chain Development
- Ravina Raj Kohli, former President of STAR News
- R. K. Kohli (born 1953), Indian educational administrator and Vice-Chancellor of Amity University
- Sunil Kumar Kohli (born 1958), 46th Controller General of Defence Accounts of India

== Armed Forces ==
- Sourendra Nath Kohli (1916–1997), former Indian Navy chief
- Mohan Singh Kohli (1931–2025), Indian Naval captain and mountaineer who led India's first mission to climb Mount Everest

== Entertainment ==
- Armaan Kohli, Indian actor
- Bisham Kohli, Indian film personality, better known as Vishal Anand
- Dev Kohli (1942–2023), Indian poet and lyricist
- Girish Kohli (born 1983), Indian author and screenwriter
- Gurdeep Kohli (born 1980), Indian actor
- Hardeep Singh Kohli (born 1969), British presenter
- Himansh Kohli (born 1989), Indian actor
- Jas Kohli, Indian author
- Kuku Kohli (born 1949), Indian director, writer, editor and screenwriter
- Kunal Kohli (born 1969), Indian film director, producer and writer
- Madan Mohan (composer) (1924–1975), Indian singer and composer
- Narendra Kohli (1940–2021), Indian Hindi-language author
- Neelu Kohli, Indian television actress
- Nishi (actress) (born 1935), Indian actor
- Purab Kohli (born 1979), Indian actor, model and former video jockey
- Rahul Kohli, English actor
- Rajkumar Kohli (1930–2023), Indian film director
- Raul Kohli, English standup comedian
- Rochak Kohli (born 1983), Indian music director, composer, singer, instrumentalist and lyricist
- Sanjeev Kohli (born 1971), British Indian comedian, writer and actor
- Seema Kohli, Indian artist
- Sunita Kohli, Indian interior designer
- Vikas Kohli, Indian musician and music producer

== Judiciary ==
- Hima Kohli (born 1959), Judge of the Supreme Court of India and former Chief Justice of the Telangana High Court
- Nalin Kohli, Indian advocate and politician
- Permod Kohli (born 1951), Indian Judge and former Chief Justice of Sikkim High Court
- Pushpa Kumari Kohli (born 1990), first female Hindu police officer in Pakistan

== Politics ==
- Manmohan Singh (1933–2024), former Prime Minister of India from 2004 to 2014
- Ajit Pal Singh Kohli, Indian politician and MLA from Patiala Assembly constituency
- Amolak Rattan Kohli (born 1942), former governor of the Indian state of Mizoram from 2001 to 2006
- Om Prakash Kohli (1935–2023), former governor of the Indian state of Gujarat from 2014 to 2019
- Abdul Ghani Kohli (born 1943), Indian J&K politician
- Mohammad Aslam Kohli, Indian J&K politician
- Krishna Kohli (born 1979), Pakistani politician (While her name is spelled as Kohli, she originates from the Koli people, who are unrelated to the Kohlis of the Khukhrain clan)
- Kuli Kohli (born 1970), Indian-British poet, writer, disabled activist and local council member
- Veeru Kohli (1964–2023), Pakistani human rights activist (While her name is spelled as Kohli, she originates from the Koli people, who are unrelated to the Kohlis of the Khukhrain clan)

== Science and medicine ==
- Anil Kohli, Indian dental surgeon and former president of the Dental Council of India.
- Martin Kohli (born 1942), Swiss sociologist
- Prerna Kohli (born 1965), Indian clinical psychologist
- Pushmeet Kohli, American computer scientist at Google DeepMind where he heads the "Robust and Reliable AI" and "AI for Science" teams.
- Sanjai Kohli, Indian electrical engineer known for his work in developing GPS
- Seetu Kohli, Indian architect and interior designer
- Sunita Kohli (born 1946), Indian architect

== Sports ==
- Fränzi Mägert-Kohli (born 1982), Swiss snowboarder.
- Kabir Kohli (born 2000), Indian footballer.
- Mohan Singh Kohli (1931–2025), Indian Naval captain and mountaineer who led India's first mission to climb Mount Everest.
- Palak Kohli (born 2002), Indian professional Para-badminton player.
- Parth Kohli (born 1996), Indian cricketer.
- Nikhil Kohli (born 1996), Indian cricketer.
- Shah Kohli (born 1976), Indian Judo player.
- Shashwat Kohli (born 1997), Indian cricketer.
- Sushil Kohli (born 1953), Indian swimmer and water polo player, Asian Games bronze medalist.
- Taruwar Kohli (born 1988), Indian cricketer.
- Virat Kohli (born 5 November 1988) is an Indian International cricketer.
