= List of awards and honours received by Manmohan Singh =

The Honourable Dr. Manmohan Singh
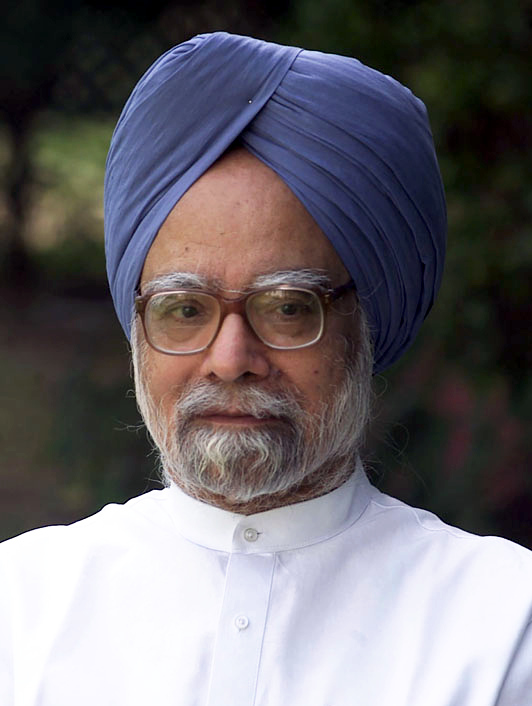
- Official portrait, 2004
- Born: Manmohan Singh; 26 September 1932; Gah, Punjab Province, British India
- Died: 26 December 2024 (aged 92); New Delhi, Delhi, India
- Education: Panjab University; St. John's College, Cambridge; Nuffield College, Oxford
- Occupations: Politician; Economist; Bureaucrat; Academician
- Years active: 1966–2024
- Organizations: United Nations Conference on Trade and Development; Delhi School of Economics
- Known for: Economic liberalisation in India
- Office: Prime Minister of India
- Term: 22 May 2004 – 26 May 2014
- Predecessor: Atal Bihari Vajpayee
- Successor: Narendra Modi
- Political party: Indian National Congress
- Board member of: Planning Commission; Reserve Bank of India; University Grants Commission
- Spouse: Gursharan Kaur (m. 1958)
- Children: 3 (including Upinder and Daman)

Manmohan Singh was an Indian economist, academic and politician who served as the Prime Minister of India for two consecutive terms (2004–09 and 2009–14). Singh held prominent posts in different organisations and received several honours for his work even before beginning his political career. He held various posts such as an advisor to the Foreign Trade Ministry, chief economic advisor in the Ministry of Finance, governor of the Reserve Bank of India, and deputy head of the Planning Commission. As the finance minister in the P. V. Narasimha Rao government in the 1990s, he carried out several structural reforms that liberalised India's economy. Singh was re-elected as the prime minister in 2009. He was the first prime minister since Jawaharlal Nehru to be re-elected after completing a full five-year term. Singh was also the first and only Sikh to hold the office and the only prime minister of India to never win a direct popular election.

Born in 1932 in Gah (British India), Singh received his early education from the Hindu College, Amritsar, where his family migrated after the Partition of India. From 1966 to 1969, he worked for the United Nations Conference on Trade and Development (UNCTAD). Later, Singh worked as a professor of International Trade at the Delhi School of Economics from 1969 to 1971. In 1972, he was appointed as the chief economic adviser to the Ministry of Finance. He became a secretary in the Finance Ministry in 1976. From 1980 to 1982, he worked for the Planning Commission of India. He served as the governor of the Reserve Bank of India from September 1982 to January 1985.

In 1985, Singh was appointed as the deputy chairman of the Planning Commission, a post he held until 1987. From 1987 to 1990, Singh worked as the secretary general of the South Commission, an independent economic think-tank based in Geneva, Switzerland. In 1990, Singh became the adviser on economic affairs to the prime minister, following his return to India. In 1991, he was appointed as the chairman of the University Grants Commission (UGC). Later that year, prime minister P. V. Narasimha Rao appointed him the Finance Minister of India, in his government—a post Singh held until 1996. Despite strong opposition, as finance minister, he was successful in implementing reforms aimed at enhancing productivity and liberalising of India's economy. In 1993, Singh led Indian delegations to the Commonwealth Heads of Government Meeting in Cyprus and to the World Conference on Human Rights in Vienna.

Singh was first elected to the upper house of Parliament, the Rajya Sabha, in 1991 by the legislature of the state of Assam; he was re-elected in 1995, 2001, 2007, 2013, and 2019. In the 2004 general elections, the Indian National Congress party joined some allies to form the United Progressive Alliance (UPA) and defeated the Bharatiya Janata Party-led National Democratic Alliance. Congress leader Sonia Gandhi recommended Singh's name for the post of prime minister and in May 2004, he became the 13th prime minister. In 2009, UPA was again successful in forming the government in the 15th Lok Sabha elections, and he was re-elected as the prime minister of India in 2009. Singh died in 2024.

== National honours ==
Ribbon	Decoration	Country	Date	Location	Presenter	Note	Ref(s)
	Padma Vibhushan	India	28 March 1987 (announced 26 January 1981)	New Delhi	President; Zail Singh	The second-highest civilian honour of India.	

== Foreign honours ==
Ribbon	Decoration	Country	Date	Location	Presenter	Note	Ref(s)
	Order of King Abdulaziz	Saudi Arabia	28 February 2010	Riyadh	King; Abdullah	Special Class, the second-highest civilian honour of Saudi Arabia.	
	Order of the Paulownia Flowers	Japan	5 November 2014 (announced 3 November 2014)	Tokyo	Emperor; Akihito	Grand Cordon, the second-highest civilian honour of Japan.	

== Scholastic ==
=== Chancellor, visitor, governor, rector and fellowships ===
Year	Fellowship	Institution	Country	Ref(s)
1957	Wrenbury scholar	University of Cambridge	United Kingdom	
1976	Honorary professor	Jawaharlal Nehru University	India	
1982	Honorary fellow	Indian Institute of Bankers	India	
1982	Honorary fellow	St John's College, Cambridge	United Kingdom	
1985	President	Indian Economic Association	India	
1986	National fellow	National Institute of Education	India	
1994	Honorary fellow	All India Management Association	India	
1994	Honorary fellow	Nuffield College, Oxford	United Kingdom	
1994	Distinguished fellow	London School of Economics	United Kingdom	
1996	Honorary professor	Delhi School of Economics	India	
1999	Fellow	National Academy of Agricultural Sciences	India	
2005	Honorary fellow	All India Institute of Medical Sciences	India	
2005	Honorary professor	Moscow State University	Russia	

=== Honorary degrees ===
Year	Degree	University	Country	Ref(s)
1983	Doctor of Letters	Panjab University	India	
1997	Doctor of Laws	University of Alberta	Canada	
2005	Doctor of Civil Law	University of Oxford	United Kingdom	
2006	Doctor of Civil Law	University of Cambridge	United Kingdom	
2007	Doctor of Letters	University of Jammu	India	
2008	Doctor of Letters	University of Madras	India	
2008	Doctor of Letters	Banaras Hindu University	India	
2010	Doctor of Letters	King Saud University	Saudi Arabia	
2010	Doctor of Letters	Moscow State Institute of International Relations	Russia	

== Other awards ==
Year	Award	Country/Organisation	Notes	Ref(s)
1952	University Medal	Panjab University	For standing first in BA Honors (Economics).	
1954	Uttar Chand Kapur Medal	Panjab University	For standing first in MA (Economics).	
1955	Wright Prize for Distinguished Performance	St John's College, Cambridge		
1956	Adam Smith Prize	University of Cambridge		
1995	Jawaharlal Nehru Birth Centenary Award	Indian Science Congress Association		
1997	Nikkei Asia Prize	Nihon Keizai Shimbun Inc.		
1997	Justice K. S. Hegde Award	Justice K. S. Hegde Foundation		
1997	Lokmanya Tilak National Award	Lokmanya Tilak Smarak Mandir Trust		
1999	H.H. Kanchi Shri Paramacharya Award for Excellence	Ramaswamy Venkataraman Centenarian Trust		
2000	Annasaheb Chirmule Award	Annasaheb Chirmule Trust		
2002	Outstanding Parliamentarian Award	Indian Parliamentary Group		
2008	Agricola Medal	(United Nations) Food and Agriculture Organization	The highest agricultural award given by the United Nations.	
2010	World Statesman Award	Appeal of Conscience Foundation		
2017	Indira Gandhi Prize	Indira Gandhi Memorial Trust		
2025	P. V. Narasimha Rao Memorial Award	P. V. Narasimha Rao Memorial Foundation	Posthumously awarded.	

== Addresses to foreign legislatures ==
Country	Legislature	Date	Ref.
Mauritius	National Assembly of Mauritius	31 March 2005	
United States	United States Congress	19 July 2005	
Japan	National Diet	14 December 2006	
Nigeria	National Assembly of Nigeria	15 October 2007	
Bhutan	Parliament of Bhutan	17 May 2008	
Afghanistan	National Assembly of Afghanistan	13 May 2011	
Ethiopia	Federal Parliamentary Assembly	25 May 2011	
Maldives	People's Majlis	12 November 2011	

== Recognition ==
Year	Recognition	Organisation	Ref(s)
1993	Finance Minister of the Year	Euromoney	
1993	Finance Minister of the Year	Asiamoney	
1994	Finance Minister of the Year	Asiamoney	
2005	100 Most Influential People in the World	Time	
2006	Indian of the Year	CNN-IBN	
2009	36th Most Powerful Person in the World	Forbes	
2010	The Most Respected Leader in the World	Newsweek	
2010	18th Most Powerful Person in the World	Forbes	
2010	100 Most Influential People in the World	Time	
2011	19th Most Powerful Person in the World	Forbes	
July 2012	Cover of Time Magazine (Asia Edition)	Time	
2012	20th Most Powerful Person in the World	Forbes	
2013	28th Most Powerful Person in the World	Forbes	

== See also ==
- List of Padma Vibhushan award recipients
