= Srirama Chandra Bhanja Dental College and Hospital =

Medical college in Odisha

- Type: Government dental college
- Established: 1944
- Affiliations: Dental Council of India
- Location: Cuttack, Odisha, India; 20.472°N 85.892°E
- Campus: Urban
- Website: https://scbdental.nic.in/

Srirama Chandra Bhanja Dental College and Hospital is a government dental college located in Cuttack, in the Indian state of Odisha. It is the oldest and only government dental college in Odisha. It is affiliated with the Utkal University and is recognized by Dental Council of India. It offers Bachelor of Dental Science (BDS) and Master of Dental Science (MDS) courses.
