= Agartala Government Dental College =

- Type: Government Dental College
- Established: 2022
- Affiliations: DCI, Tripura University
- Students: Total: BDS - (50-63)
- Location: Agartala, Tripura, India; 23°49′51.8″N 91°16′32.82″E
- Campus: Urban
- Website: https://agdc.tripura.gov.in/

Agartala Government Dental College (AGDC) is a government dental college located in Agartala, in the Indian state of Tripura. It is affiliated with the Tripura University and is recognized by Dental Council of India. It is the first dental college in Tripura.

DEPARTMENTS:

1. Oral and Maxillofacial Surgery 2. Oral Medicine and Radiology 3. Oral Pathology and Microbiology 4. Prosthodontics - Crown and Bridge 5. Conservative Dentistry and Endodontics 6. Periodontology and Implantology 7. Pediatric Dentistry 8. Public Health Dentistry or Community Dentistry 9. Orthodontics and Dentofacial Orthopedics
