= ITS Dental Hospital =

Hospital in Uttar Pradesh, India

- Durga Charitable Society
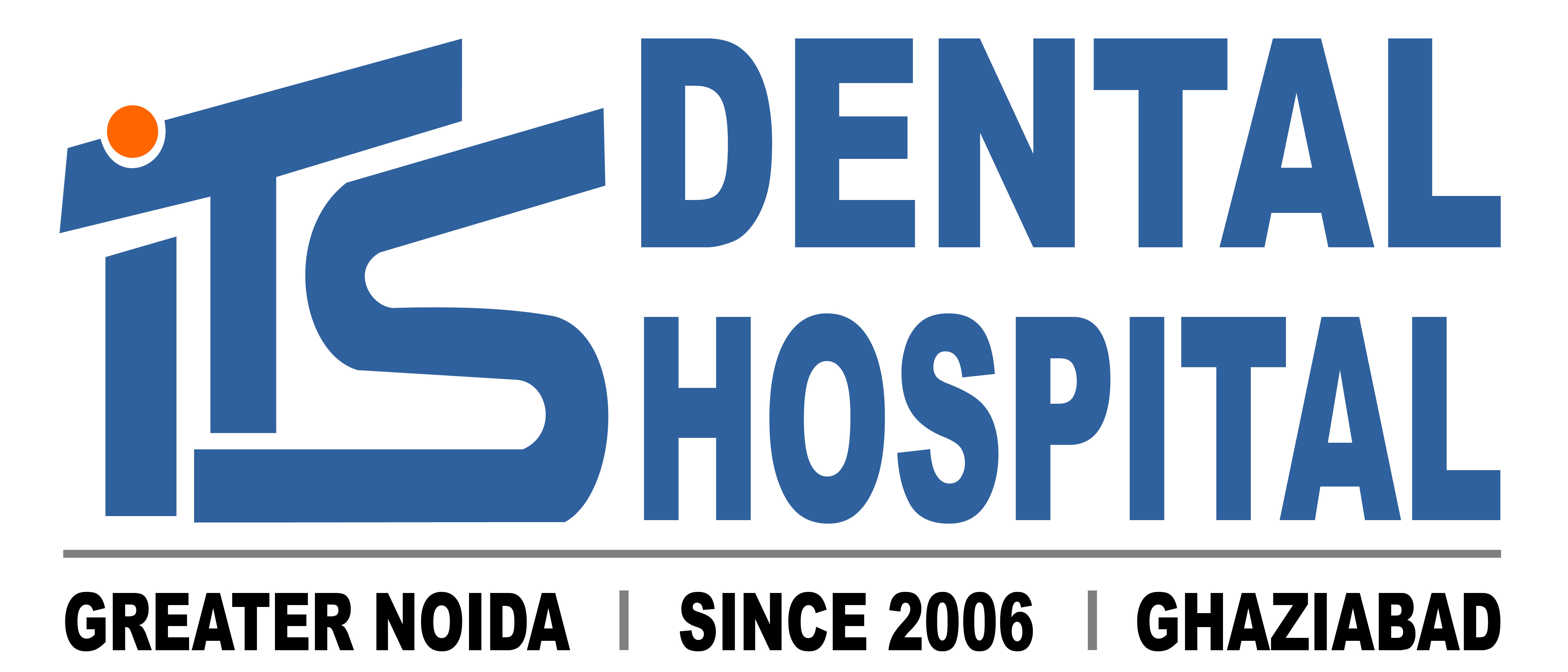

Geography
- Location: 47, Knowledge Park III, Greater Noida, NCR, Uttar Pradesh, India
- Coordinates: 28.469087°N 77.488857°E

Organisation
- Care system: Private multi-specialty hospitals
- Type: Private
- Affiliated university: DCI, NABH, ISO
- Patron: Mr. Sohil Chadha

Services
- Standards: DCI, NABH, ISO
- Beds: 100+

History
- Founded: 2006

Links
- Website: www.itsdentalhospitals.com
- Lists: Hospitals in India

Established in 2006, ITS Dental Hospital is part of the prestigious ITS Group. True to its motto “In Service For A Healthy Nation", ITS Dental Hospital, focuses on providing the treatments at affordable costs. The hospital also provides free transport, medicines and heavily subsidized treatment to the needy patients. Housed with CBCT, Oral Scanners etc. ITS Dental Hospital is an dental hospital and research center located in Greater Noida, Uttar Pradesh, India run ITS Dental College providing Dental PG & UG education with Specialization.

== History ==
ITS Dental Hospital Greater Noida was established in 2006 by Durga Charitable Trust. It is part of the ITS group was founded in 1996 by Dr. R.P. Chadha. The group provides teaching and learning practices in the areas of Dental, Engineering, Management, and Pharmacy Education. ITS Dental has its other branches in Murad Nagar, Ghaziabad.

== Awards ==
- Guinness World Records 2018, most people using mouthwash is 4,097.

== Social initiatives ==
ITS Dental Hospital has undertaken a "go green" initiative. Its main focus is on the reduction of carbon footprints, solid waste management, and alternative energy resources. In 2020, the hospital staff provided 250 beds for corona virus disease patients.
