= Manubhai Patel Dental College =

College of dentistry

Coordinates: 22°16′59″N 73°10′23″E

Manubhai Patel Dental College is a college of dentistry located in Baroda, Gujarat, India. It provides Bachelor of Dental Surgery (BDS) courses. The institution is listed no. 25 in the education guide of medical institutes by Zee news. The college is affiliated to Bhavnagar University in Gujarat. The college is recognized by Dental Council of India and Ministry of Health and Family Welfare of India. Times of India on 5 March 2012 reported that in recently held All India Post Graduate Examinations of 2012 held by All India Institute of Medical Sciences, New Delhi, three students of dental college, the highest from any dental college in Gujarat were selected for the MDS courses at various government dental college around India.
