= Dentists (Amendment) Act, 2016 =

Indian legislation

Parliament of India
- Long title: An Act further to amend the Dentists Act, 1948.
- Citation: Act No. 40 of 2016
- Territorial extent: India
- Passed by: Lok Sabha
- Passed: 19 July 2016
- Passed by: Rajya Sabha
- Passed: 1 August 2016
- Assented to by: President of India
- Assented to: 4 August 2016
- Effective: 24 May 2016

Legislative history

Initiating chamber: Lok Sabha
- Bill title: The Dentists (Amendment) Bill, 2016
- Bill citation: Bill No. 168 of 2016
- Introduced by: MoH&FW J. P. Nadda
- Introduced: 19 July 2016
- Passed: 19 July 2016

Revising chamber: Rajya Sabha
- Passed: 1 August 2016

Amends
- Dentists Act, 1948

Repeals
- Dentists (Amendment) Ordinance, 2016
- Status: In force

The Dentists (Amendment) Act, 2016 (Act No. 40 of 2016) is an act of the Parliament of India to amend the Dentists Act, 1948. It was made for the applicability of NEET for the dentistry courses.

== Act ==
=== 10 D ===
Uniform entrance examination for all dental colleges for undergraduate and postgraduate level in languages like Hindi, English language and other languages.

=== 20 ===
The authority, other languages and the manner of conducting of uniform entrance examination.
