= List of honorary fellows of St John's College, Cambridge =

St John's College, Cambridge awards honorary fellowships to people who have distinguished themselves in various walks of life.

- Thomas Adès
- Sir Richard Aikens
- Sir Edward Appleton
- Sir John Ball
- Laura Bates
- Sir Jack Beatson
- Mike Brearley
- John Brightman, Baron Brightman
- John Browne, Baron Browne of Madingley
- Dan Burt
- Peter Carnley
- Sir Bryan Cartledge
- Manuel Castells
- Louis Cha
- Owen Chadwick
- Richard Chartres, Baron Chartres
- Claire Craig
- Mark Coombs
- Charles Corfield
- Sir David Cox
- Nigel Crisp, Baron Crisp
- Heidi-Ann Doughty
- Richard Eberhart
- Jennifer Egan
- Marc Feigen
- Anthony Freeling
- Richard Goldstone
- Richard Goody
- Hugh Griffiths, Baron Griffiths
- Andrew D. Hamilton
- David Harvey
- Norman Heatley
- Peter Hennessy, Baron Hennessy of Nympsfield
- David Hope, Baron Hope of Craighead
- Sir David Hopwood
- Sir John Horlock
- Frank Iacobucci
- Sir Derek Jacobi
- Andrew Jacovides
- Sir Simon Keenlyside
- Sir David King
- Mervyn King, Baron King of Lothbury
- Sir Harpal Kumar
- Sir Tim Lankester
- Dame Louise Makin
- Tshilidzi Marwala
- Eric Maskin
- Sir Jonathan Miller
- Sir Mark Moody-Stuart
- Fergus Morton, Baron Morton of Henryton
- Michael Mustill, Baron Mustill
- Bernard Ntahoturi
- Robin Orr
- Sir Roger Palin
- Sharon Peacock
- Sir Roger Penrose
- Annamarie Phelps
- J. G. A. Pocock
- Sir David Pountney
- Sheena Radford
- Colin Renfrew, Baron Renfrew of Kaimsthorn
- Abdus Salam
- Sir Michael Scholar
- Manmohan Singh
- Jane Stapleton
- Sydney Templeman, Baron Templeman
- Isaac Todhunter
- Eben Upton
- Bhaskar Vira
- Sir Douglas Wass
- William, Prince of Wales
- Sir David Wilson
- Walter Woon
