= Gah, Pakistan =

Village in Punjab, Pakistan

Gah گاہ
- Village
- Location within Punjab, Pakistan Location within Pakistan
- Coordinates: 33°3′45″N 72°39′8″E
- Country: Pakistan
- Province: Punjab
- Division: Rawalpindi
- District: Chakwal
- Union council: Begal
- Time zone: UTC+5 (PST)

Gah (Urdu pronunciation: [gaːɦ]) is a village of Chakwal District, in the Punjab province of Pakistan. It is located in the union council of Begal at 33°3′45″N 72°39′8″E. The Naib Nazim or vice administrator of Begal is from Gah. Gah or Gai is believed to have derived from 'Gohar' a former chieftain of the village. Gohar later became "Garaha" and subsequently shortened to "Gah".

The village is known widely for being the birthplace of former Indian prime minister Manmohan Singh. Due to the violence that accompanied the Partition of India in 1947, Hindus and Sikhs had to leave the area for India. In 2004, after Singh became prime minister, the Punjab provincial Government declared it would develop Gah as a model village in his honour. A local boys school was renamed Manmohan Singh Government Boys Primary School in his honour. In October 2012, TERI—a research institute from India set up a mini grid of solar power as a mark of goodwill to Singh. The mini grid supplied power to 51 families in the village and water heaters of three mosques.
