= Begal, Chakwal =

Begal بیگال
- Village
- Location within Punjab, Pakistan Location within Pakistan
- Coordinates: 33°2′57″N 72°39′11″E
- Country: Pakistan
- Province: Punjab
- Division: Rawalpindi Division
- District: Chakwal District
- Tehsil: Chakwal Tehsil
- Time zone: UTC+5:00 (PKT)

Begal (Urdu: بیگال) is a village and union council in the Chakwal District of Punjab, Pakistan. It is part of the Chakwal Tehsil, and is located at 33°2'57N 72°39'11E.
