= Seetu Kohli =

Indian architect

- Citizenship: India
- Education: Sushant School of Art and Architecture
- Occupations: architect, Interior furniture designer
- Known for: Founding Seetu Kohli Home

Seetu Kohli is an Indian architect and interior designer. She is the founder and CEO of Seetu Kohli Home, an Indian-based furniture company.

== Early life and education ==
She was born in Jammu India. She graduated as an architect from Sushant School of Art and Architecture in Gurgaon.

== Career ==
Kohli started her company with her husband but later branched out on her own. She has designed and executed homes in hotels, offices, malls including Westin gurgaon, Westin resorts Haryana, and others.

She worked with DLF, Vatika, Ambience, and other home designers. She designed and furnished an Armani Casa townhouse for the Mshreib complex in Qatar. Later, she became the furniture supplier to private Yachts and homes across some locations.

Kohli launched a home line with designer Manish Malhotra. She also launched a made in India brand for furniture and accessories called Mallika's Edit.

Kohli is a co-chair for the core committee for luxury and lifestyle by CII in India. She was on the jury of Luxury Lifestyle Awards held in Singapore. She was announced as one of the 3 formidable women displaying at the AD show in Mumbai in 2018 by Vogue magazine in India. She has been featured in various magazines and is widely recognised for her work and her journey as a global women entrepreneur.
