= Sunita Kohli =

Indian architect

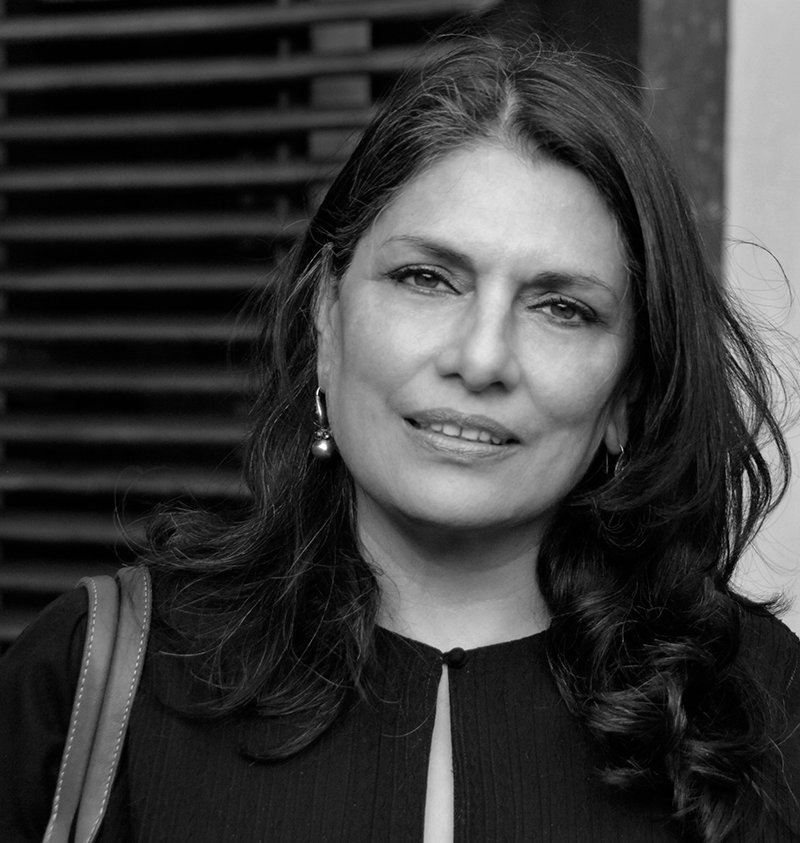
- Born: 28 December 1946 (age 79); Lahore, Punjab, India
- Education: Lady Shriram College, New Delhi and Lucknow University
- Occupation: interior designer
- Awards: Padma Shri
- Practice: President, K2India (Architecture, Interior Design, Furniture, Restoration, Landscape, Construction)
- Website: www.k2india.com

Sunita Kohli is an Indian interior designer, architectural restorer and furniture manufacturer. She has restored and decorated Rashtrapati Bhavan (the President's House), Parliament House Colonnade (1985–1989), the Prime Minister's Office and Hyderabad House in New Delhi.

She was awarded the Padma Shri by the Government of India in 1992.

== Early life and education ==
Born in Lakshmi Mansions to Indar Prakash and Chand Sur, Sunita Kohli grew up in Lucknow. She studied at the Loreto Convent in Lucknow. Her father took her to auctions and sales, looking for old lamps and furniture. Later she graduated in English Literature from Lady Shri Ram College (Delhi University) in New Delhi, followed by an M.A. in English from Lucknow University.

== Career ==
Kohli taught at Loreto Convent Lucknow, before the start of her career in interior design. After her marriage, she and her husband started frequenting shops in their free time, looking for 19th century English furniture and lamps in Lucknow, Rajasthan, and the hill resorts of Dehradun and Mussoorie. Kohli converted her interest into an antiquarian business through which she sold Davenport desks and Regency wine tables. She learnt restoration of furniture from local craftsmen, which led to the start of her restoration business.

She established Sunita Kohli Interior Designs, an interior design firm in New Delhi, in 1971. In the following year she established Sunita Kohli & Company, which manufactures contemporary classic furniture and reproductions of Art Deco, Biedermeier and Anglo-Indian colonial furniture. Her company, K2india, whose CEO is her daughter, launched a collection of mid-century furniture.

In Lahore, Pakistan, she worked on the restoration and conversion into a boutique hotel of a late Sikh-period haveli in the Old City. In the early 1990s, she did the interior design of the British Council Building in New Delhi. She also designed the National Assembly Building in Thimpu, Bhutan. This building was again worked on in 2010, by K2india for the SAARC Summit in Bhutan. She has also been involved in the restoration and redecoration of numerous British Raj period buildings in New Delhi, including Rashtrapati Bhawan (formerly Viceroy's House), the Prime Minister's Office, Parliament House and Hyderabad House.

In 1992, she was awarded the Padma Shri by the Government of India "for contribution to national life by excellence in the field of Interior Design and Architectural Restoration". In the same year, she received the "Mahila Shiromani Award", recognising women of achievement, by Mother Teresa.

In 2010, she and her daughter formed K2india, bringing together all their respective companies. In 2010, she again got involved in the conservation work of Rashtrapati Bhavan, after a gap of 19 years.

In 2005, Kohli was instrumental in the conceptualisation and founding of the Museum of Women in the Arts, India. She has been on the National Advisory Board of the National Museum of Women in the Arts in Washington, D.C.

In 2014, she was nominated as the chairperson of the board of governors of the School of Planning and Architecture, Bhopal by the MHRD, Government of India, for a period of five years. In 2019, she joined the board of advisors at Rishihood University.

== Personal life ==
In 1971, Sunita Kohli married Ramesh Kohli, an equity investor and alumni of the Doon School in Dehradun, St. Stephens College and Delhi University's faculty of law. They have three children.
