= Anil Kohli =

Indian dental surgeon

Brigadier Dr. Anil Kohli
- Education: B.D.S, M.D.S (Lko), FDS RCS (England)
- Alma mater: King George's Medical College
- Occupation: Medical professional
- Awards: Padma Shri (1992); Padma Bhushan (2005); Shanti Swarup Bhatnagar Award; B C Roy National Award (2005)
Background
- Medical career
- Profession: Surgeon
- Sub-specialties: Conservative Dentistry and Endodontics
- Website: dranilkohli.com

Signature
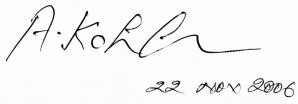

Anil Kohli is an Indian dental surgeon, medical administrator and a former president of the Dental Council of India. He is an elected fellow of the Faculty of Dental Surgery of the Royal College of Surgeons of England and holds the honorary rank of 'Brigadier' in the Army Dental Corps. He is a recipient of B. C. Roy Award, the highest Indian award in the medical category. The Government of India awarded him the fourth highest civilian honor of the Padma Shri in 1992 and followed it up with the third highest civilian honour of the Padma Bhushan, in 2005, for his contributions to medicine, making him the first dentist to receive both the honors.

== Biography ==
Anil Kohli, an alumnus of King George's Medical College, Lucknow, from where he secured his graduate degree in medicine and postgraduate degree in dental sciences, received the S. S. Bhatnagar Award during his student days from his alma mater. He is a former Dean of Dentistry at the Baba Farid University of Health Sciences and an adjunct professor at Tufts University School of Dental Medicine. In 1992, when he received the Padma Shri award, he became the first dentist to receive the honor. The Government of India honored him again in 2005 with the higher Padma honor of the Padma Bhushan; two years later, he received the B. C. Roy Award, the highest Indian medical award. He was associated with the Dental Council of India as a member of the executive committee from 2001 to 2004 when he was elected as its president, a post he held for two tenancies, 2004–2005 and 2009–2010.

== Works and contributions ==
Anil Kohli has served as the dentist surgeon to Presidents of India for more than 20 years. He has also served as dentist to the Prime Ministers of India. He is presently editor-in-chief of the Indian Journal of Dental Research and representative of Asia in the world body of Endodontics IFEA. He has received fellowships from all the three Royal College of Surgeons, Glasgow, Edinburgh and England. He has also received more than 10 honorary doctorates from different universities in the world. Dr. Anil Kohli was honoured at an oral cancer fundraising event on 6 October 2018, at the River Rock Casino Resort in Richmond.

== Controversy ==
In 2010, corruption charges appeared against Kohli in the media, which he refuted. Subsequently, the Central Bureau of Investigation raided Kohli's home and office and filed a case against him for holding disproportionate assets. However, the case was closed after nine months of investigations by the agency, exonerating Kohli from the charges.

== See also ==
- Dental Council of India
- King George's Medical University
