= Dentists Act, 1948 =

Constituent Assembly of India
- Long title: An Act to regulate the profession of dentistry.
- Citation: Act No. 16 of 1948
- Territorial extent: India
- Enacted by: Constituent Assembly of India
- Enacted: 29 March 1948
- Assented to by: Governor-General Lord Mountbatten
- Commenced: 29 March 1948
- Repealed: 19 March 2026

Amended by
- Dentists (Amendment) Act, 1950; Dentists (Amendment) Act, 1955; Repealing and Amending Act, 1957; Dentists (Amendment) Act, 1972; Delegated Legislation Provisions (Amendment) Act, 1985; Dentists (Amendment) Act, 1993; Dentists (Amendment) Act, 2016; Dentists (Amendment) Act, 2019

Repealed by
- National Dental Commission Act, 2023
- Status: Repealed

The Dentists Act, 1948 was an Indian legislation which regulates the profession of dentistry. This was enacted during India's Dominion period (August 1947 to January 1950) by the Constituent Assembly of India, which also played the role the parliament.

== Amendments ==
Dentists (Amendment) Act, 2016 was passed by Rajya Sabha, the upper house of India's parliament, on 1 August 2016, approving the applicability of NEET. This act is to be replaced with National Dental Commission Act, 2023.
