= Jas Kohli =

Indian fictional author

Dr Jas Kohli
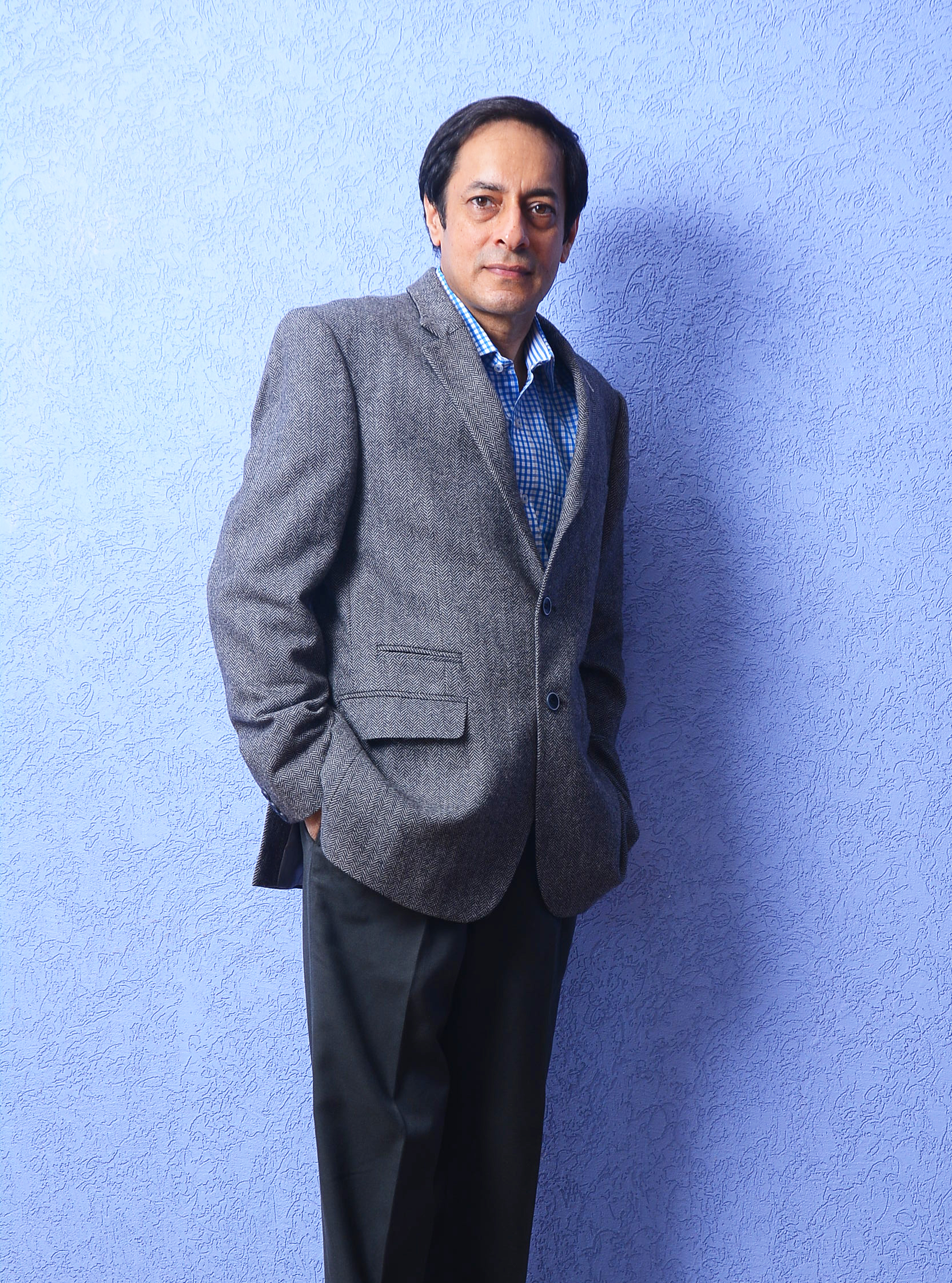
- Dr Jas Kohli
- Born: Ludhiana, Punjab, India
- Occupations: Plastic Surgeon, Author
- Writing career
- Period: 2000–present
- Website: jaskohli.com

Jas Kohli is an Indian fiction author. His novel Anything to Look Hot was published in 2015 by Shristi Publishers. Kohli is a columnist at The Daily Guardian and his second book, Lights! Wedding! Ludhiana!, was released in October 2022.

== Early life and career ==
Kohli was born in Ludhiana, Punjab, India to doctor parents. He started his career by completing his MBBS and MS at Dayanand Medical College. After working as a surgeon for five years, he did his super-specialization (MCh) in plastic surgery and joined Safdarjang Hospital in New Delhi. Later, he worked in hospitals at Michigan the United States, Chandigarh and Ludhiana.

== Personal life ==
He currently practices laser cosmetic surgery at the Elina Aesthetic and Laser Clinic in Ludhiana. His wife is an anesthesiologist and they have a son and a daughter.

== Bibliography ==
=== Anything to Look Hot ===
Kohli authored the novel Anything to Look Hot which was first released in October 2015. It is a fictional book which is based on the experiences of a plastic surgeon. It describes the journey of the protagonist, Dr Dhruv from the days of his training to his stint in Bollywood where he shapes the movie stars and has a combination of humour, drama and action. The novel has been published by Srishti publishers.

=== Lights! Wedding! Ludhiana! ===
Lights! Wedding! Ludhiana! is his second book which is also fiction and reflects upon lifestyle and culture in the state of Punjab and its inhabitants. Jairam Menon writes about the book at The Week and says You will read it because it asks for little effort from you

=== Academic publications ===
- Kohli JS, Pande S, Bajaj SP. Large transverse fasciocutaneous leg flap: whole leg flap. Br J Plast Surg. 2000 Sep;53(6):495-8. doi: 10.1054/bjps.2000.3369. PMID 10927680
- Pande S, Kohli JS, Arora S, Bajaj SP. The osseofasciocutaneous flap: a new method to transfer fibula along with a sufficient amount of skin. Br J Plast Surg. 2002 Jun;55(4):312-9. doi: 10.1054/bjps.2002.3844. PMID 12160538.

== See also ==
- Indian English literature
