= Ravina Raj Kohli =

Ravina Raj Kohli, former President of STAR News and CEO of Channel Nine, is a media professional in India.

== Career ==
She was appointed as the President of Star News Channel, to transition its break from NDTV. Before that, Australian media tycoon, Kerry Packer chose her to head Channel Nine in India. Prior to Channel 9, Ravina was Senior Vice President Programming and Marketing for Sony Entertainment Television after her return from Singapore as Executive Creative Director of CR and Grey Advertising.

She is also the founder and Executive Director of JobCorp Company which is dedicated for empowerment of women.
