= Mohammad Aslam Kohli =

Indian politician

Mohammad Aslam Kohli is a political leader from the Indian state of Jammu and Kashmir. He is the head of the Gujjar and Bakerwal Tehreek-e-Insaf, an organization representing Gujjar and Bakarwal interests, such as ensuring continuation of statewide job reservations for Gujjars under the Scheduled Tribe list and participating in the Gujjar movement to be listed as a Scheduled Tribe at the national level. He is also a leader of the Jammu Migrants Front, an organization engaged in advocacy for internal migrants from the Jammu region of Jammu and Kashmir state.
