= Daman Singh =

Indian writer

- Born: 4 September 1963 (age 62); Chandigarh, India
- Education: St. Stephen’s College, Delhi; Institute of Rural Management, Anand
- Occupation: Writer
- Spouse: Ashok Patnaik (m. 1991)
- Children: Rohan Patnaik
- Parents: Manmohan Singh (father); Gursharan Kaur (mother)
- Relatives: Upinder Singh (sister)

Daman Singh (born 4 September 1963) is an Indian writer and daughter of former Prime Minister of India, Manmohan Singh.

== Personal life ==
Singh was born on 4 September 1963 in Chandigarh to Manmohan Singh and Gursharan Kaur. She has two sisters, Upinder Singh and Amrit Singh. In 1966, Singh and her family moved to New York City, where her father worked for UNCTAD. She is married to Ashok Patnaik (IPS officer of 1983 batch) since 1991 who was also the CEO of the National Intelligence Grid (NATGRID) of India. Together, they have a son, Rohan.

== Books ==
- The Last Frontier: People And Forests in Mizoram (1996) ISBN 9788185419176
- The Sacred Grove (2012) ISBN 9789350292556
- Nine by Nine (2013) ISBN 9789350292716
- Strictly Personal: Manmohan and Gursharan (2014) ISBN 9789351363255
