= Upinder Singh =

Indian historian (born 1959)

Dean of Faculty Ashoka University
- Incumbent
- Assumed office 2018

Personal details
- Born: 22 June 1959 (age 67)
- Spouse: Vijay Tankha
- Children: 2
- Parents: Manmohan Singh (father); Gursharan Kaur (mother)
- Relatives: Daman Singh (sister)
- Education: McGill University, Canada (PhD); St. Stephen's College, Delhi
- Occupation: Historian; Professor
- Awards: Infosys Prize

Upinder Singh (born 22 June 1959) is an Indian historian who is a professor of History and Dean of Faculty at Ashoka University. She is the former head of the History Department at the University of Delhi. She is also the recipient of the inaugural Infosys Prize in the category of Social Sciences (History). She is the daughter of Former Indian Prime minister Manmohan Singh.

== Education and professional life ==
Singh is an alumna of St. Stephen's College, Delhi and received a PhD from McGill University in Canada. She has a Master of Arts in history and an M.Phil. in history, both from the University of Delhi. She has a Ph.D. from McGill University, Montreal, Canada, with a thesis titled Kings, Brahmanas, and Temples in Orissa: an epigraphic study (300–1147 CE). She is a Professor in the Department of History at Ashoka University.

== Personal life ==
Singh is the daughter of Dr. Manmohan Singh, the former prime minister of India, and history professor Gursharan Kaur. She is married to Vijay Tankha, a professor of philosophy and has two sons.

== Honours ==
Singh was awarded the Netherlands Government Reciprocal Fellowship in 1985, to pursue research at the Instituut Kern, Leiden. She was awarded the Ancient India and Iran Trust/Wallace India Visiting Fellowship to pursue research in Cambridge and London in 1999. She was also a visiting fellow of Lucy Cavendish College, Cambridge. Singh has received the prestigious Daniel Ingalls Fellowship at the Harvard-Yenching Institute, Harvard University in 2005.

She is the national coordinator for history at the Institute of Life Long Learning at the University of Delhi.

She was visiting professor at the University of Leuven, Belgium, as the recipient of the Erasmus Mundus Fellowship, May–June 2010.

== Controversies ==
On 25 February 2008, right-wing activists demonstrated at the Delhi University campus, in protest against an essay by A.K. Ramanujan titled Three Hundred Ramayanas. The activists felt the essay was offensive, and alleged that Singh was responsible for its inclusion in a list of recommended readings for the BA programme in history. The University denied the allegation and stated that Singh was "… neither the editor nor compiler of the book on Cultural History of Ancient India."

== Publications ==
=== Books authored ===
- Kings, Brāhmaṇas and temples in Orissa: an epigraphic study AD 300-1147. New Delhi: Munshiram Manoharlal Publ. 1994. ISBN 9788121506212.
- Ancient Delhi. New Delhi: Oxford University Press. 1999. ISBN 9780195649192.
- Mysteries Of The Past: Archeological Sites In India. India: National Book Trust. 2002. ISBN 9788123739793. (for children)
- The discovery of ancient India: early archaeologists and the beginnings of archaeology. Delhi: Permanent Black. 2004. ISBN 9788178240886.
- A History of Ancient and Early Medieval India: From the Stone Age to the 12th Century. New Delhi: Pearson Longman. 2008. ISBN 9788131716779.
- Rethinking Early Medieval India: A Reader. OUP India. 2012. ISBN 9780198086062.
- With Dhar, Parul Pandya & Vatsyayan, Kapila (2014). Asian Encounters: Exploring Connected Histories. Oxford University Press. ISBN 9780198099802.
- Political Violence in Ancient India. Harvard University Press. 2017. ISBN 9780674975279.
- Ancient India: Culture Of Contradictions. Aleph Book Company. 2021. ISBN 978-9390652617.

=== Books edited ===
- Delhi: Ancient history. New Delhi: Social Science Press. 2006. ISBN 9788187358299.
- With Lahiri, Nayanjot, eds. (2009). Ancient India: new research. Delhi: Oxford University Press. ISBN 9780198060284.
- Upnayan - the beginner children's educational ancient tradition in the Hindu religion scripts.

=== Papers ===
- "Amaravati: the dismembering of the Mahācaitya (1797–1886)". South Asian Studies. 17 (1): 19–40. January 2001. doi:10.1080/02666030.2001.9628590. S2CID 194091154.
- "Cults and shrines in early historical Mathura (c. 200 B.C. – A.D. 200)". World Archaeology. 36 (3): 378–398. September 2004. doi:10.1080/0043824042000282803. S2CID 161320144.

== See also ==
- History of India
