= Gursharan Kaur =

Former Spouse of the Prime Minister of India

Gursharan Kaur Kohli
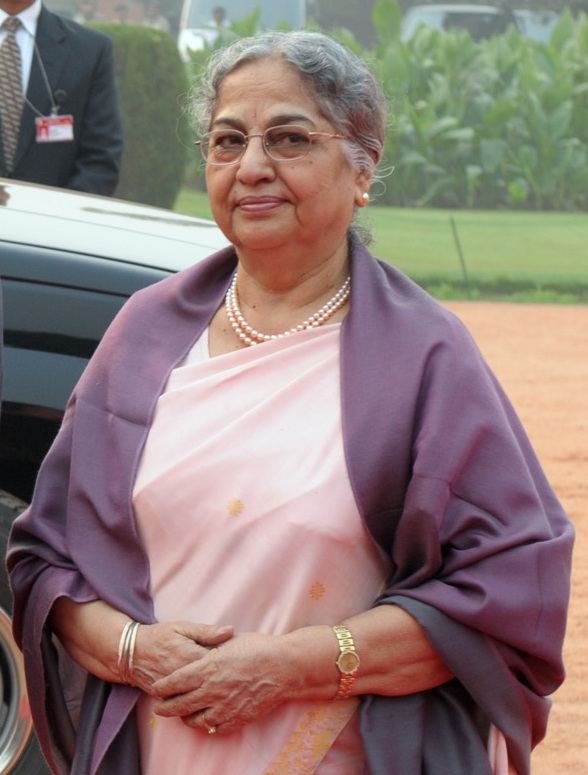
- Kaur in November 2012

Spouse of the Prime Minister of India
- In role 22 May 2004 – 26 May 2014
- Prime Minister: Manmohan Singh
- Preceded by: Shiela Gujral
- Succeeded by: Jashodaben Modi

Personal details
- Born: Gursharan Kaur Kohli Jalandhar, Punjab, British India (present-day Punjab, India)
- Party: Indian National Congress
- Spouse: Manmohan Singh (m. 1958; died 2024)
- Children: 3 (including Upinder and Daman)
- Occupation: Author; professor

Gursharan Kaur Kohli is an Indian history professor, author. She was the former Spouse of the Prime Minister of India and the widow of the former Prime Minister of India, Dr. Manmohan Singh.

== Early life ==
Kaur was the youngest of seven siblings born to Sardar Chattar Singh Kaur an engineer of Burmah-Shell, and Smt. Bhagwanti Kaur in Chakwal on 13 September 1937 in British India. She has four sisters and two brothers. Her ancestral village was Dhakku in Jhelum district, Punjab, British India (now in Punjab, Pakistan).

Kaur is known in the Sikh community of Delhi for her kirtan singing, and has also appeared on Jalandhar Radio.

== Later life ==
Since Manmohan Singh became Prime Minister in 2004, she has accompanied him abroad on state visits. The family has largely stayed out of the limelight. Their three daughters – Upinder, Daman and Amrit, have successful, non-political careers. Upinder Kaur is a professor of history at Ashoka University. She has written six books, including Ancient Delhi (1999) and A History of Ancient and Early Medieval India (2008). Daman Kaur is a graduate of St. Stephen's College, Delhi and Institute of Rural Management, Anand, Gujarat, and author of The Last Frontier: People and Forests in Mizoram and a novel Nine by Nine. Amrit Singh is a staff attorney at the ACLU.
