= Manmohan Singh =

Prime Minister of India from 2004 to 2014

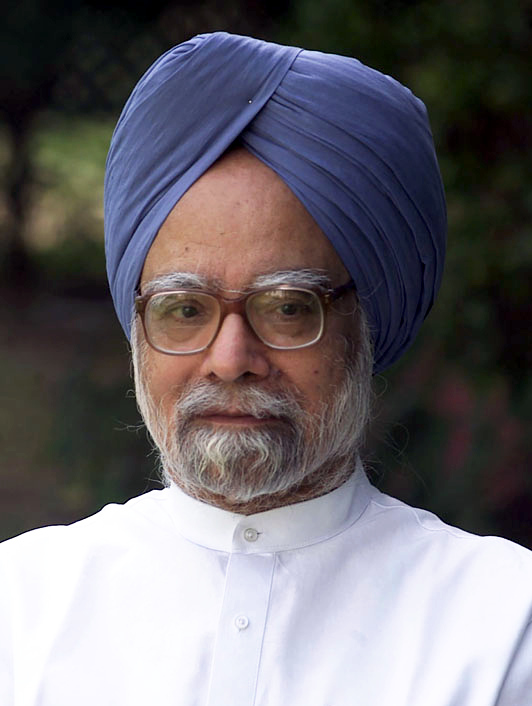
- Official portrait, 2004

Prime Minister of India
- In office 22 May 2004 – 26 May 2014
- President: A. P. J. Abdul Kalam; Pratibha Patil; Pranab Mukherjee
- Vice President: Bhairon Singh Shekhawat; Mohammad Hamid Ansari
- Cabinet: Manmohan I; Manmohan II
- Preceded by: Atal Bihari Vajpayee
- Succeeded by: Narendra Modi
Additional ministries
In office 22 May 2004 – 26 May 2014
Ministry and Departments	Personnel, Public Grievances and Pensions; Department of Atomic Energy; Department of Space; Planning Commission
Preceded by	L. K. Advani; Atal Bihari Vajpayee
Succeeded by	Narendra Modi

Union Minister of Finance
- In office 21 June 1991 – 16 May 1996
- Prime Minister: P. V. Narasimha Rao
- Preceded by: Yashwant Sinha
- Succeeded by: Jaswant Singh

Leader of the Opposition in Rajya Sabha
- In office 21 March 1998 – 21 May 2004
- Prime Minister: Atal Bihari Vajpayee
- Chairman: Krishan Kant; Bhairon Singh Shekhawat
- Preceded by: Sikander Bakht
- Succeeded by: Jaswant Singh

Member of Parliament, Rajya Sabha
- In office 19 August 2019 – 3 April 2024
- Preceded by: Madan Lal Saini
- Succeeded by: Sonia Gandhi
- Constituency: Rajasthan
- In office 1 October 1991 – 14 June 2019
- Preceded by: Amritlal Basumatary
- Succeeded by: Kamakhya Prasad Tasa
- Constituency: Assam

Governor of the Reserve Bank of India
- In office 16 September 1982 – 14 January 1985
- Preceded by: I. G. Patel
- Succeeded by: Amitav Ghosh

Personal details
- Born: 26 September 1932 Gah, Punjab Province, British India
- Died: 26 December 2024 (aged 92) New Delhi, India
- Party: Indian National Congress
- Spouse: Gursharan Kaur (m. 1958)
- Children: 3 (including Upinder and Daman)
- Education: Panjab University (BA, MA); University of Cambridge (BA); University of Oxford (DPhil)
- Profession: Economist; academician; lecturer; professor; bureaucrat; statesman
- Awards: List of awards and honours
- Manmohan Singh's voice Singh delivering a joint address to the United States Congress; Recorded 19 July 2005

Manmohan Singh (Note: Panjabi: Manamohana Singha, pronounced [mə̞n.ˈmóːə̆n ˈsɪ́ŋɡ]) (26 September 1932 – 26 December 2024) was an Indian economist, bureaucrat, academician and statesman who served as the prime minister of India from 2004 to 2014. He was the fourth longest-serving prime minister after Jawaharlal Nehru, Indira Gandhi, and Narendra Modi. A member of the Indian National Congress, Singh was the first and remains the only Sikh prime minister of India. He was also the first prime minister since Nehru to be re-appointed after completing a full five-year term.

Born in Gah in what is today Pakistan, Singh's family migrated to India during its partition in 1947. After obtaining his doctorate in economics from the University of Oxford, Singh worked for the United Nations during 1966–1969. He subsequently began his bureaucratic career when Lalit Narayan Mishra hired him as an advisor in the Ministry of Commerce and Industry. During the 1970s and 1980s, Singh held several key posts in the Government of India, such as Chief Economic Advisor (1972–1976), governor of the Reserve Bank (1982–1985) and head of the NITI Aayog (erstwhile, Planning Commission) (1985–1987)

In 1991, under prime minister, P. V. Narasimha Rao, Singh was appointed as finance minister. Over the next few years, despite strong opposition, he carried out several structural reforms that liberalised India's economy. It enhanced Singh's reputation globally as a leading reform-minded economist. Subsequently, Singh was leader of the opposition in the Rajya Sabha (the upper house of the Parliament of India) during the Atal Bihari Vajpayee government of 1998–2004.

In 2004, when the Congress-led United Progressive Alliance (UPA) came to power, its chairperson Sonia Gandhi unexpectedly relinquished the prime ministership to Singh. His first ministry executed several projects and key legislation, including the National Rural Health Mission, Unique Identification Authority, Rural Employment Guarantee scheme and Right to Information Act. In 2008, opposition to a historic civil nuclear agreement with the United States nearly caused Singh's government to fall after Left Front parties withdrew their support. The 2009 general election saw the UPA return with an increased mandate, with Singh retaining the office of prime minister. In 2009, BRICS was established with India as one of the founding members. His coalition's second term was marked by political scandals.

Singh opted out of the race for the office of prime minister during the 2014 Indian general election. Singh served as a member of the Rajya Sabha, representing the state of Assam from 1991 to 2019 and Rajasthan from 2019 to 2024.

== Early life and education ==
Singh was born to Gurmukh Singh Kohli and Amrit Kaur on 26 September 1932, in Gah, Punjab, British India, into a family of Punjabi Sikh dried fruit traders of Khatri background. His mother died when he was very young. He was raised by his paternal grandmother Jamna Devi, with whom he was very close.

Singh was initially educated at a local gurdwara, where he began studying Urdu and Punjabi. On 17 April 1937, he was enrolled in the local Government Primary School, where he continued his Urdu-medium education until the age of 10 (Class 4), after which he and his family moved to Peshawar. There, Singh was enrolled in the upper-primary Khalsa School. He sat for his matriculation examination in the summer of 1947. Even as prime minister years later, Singh wrote his apparently Hindi speeches in the Urdu script, although sometimes he would also use Gurmukhi, a script used to write Punjabi, his mother tongue.

After the Partition of India, his family migrated to Haldwani, India. In 1948 they relocated to Amritsar, where he studied at Hindu College, Amritsar. He attended Panjab University, then in Hoshiarpur, Punjab, studying Economics and got his bachelor's and master's degrees in 1952 and 1954, respectively, standing first throughout his academic career. He completed his Economics Tripos at University of Cambridge in 1957. He was a member of St John's College.

In a 2005 interview with the British journalist Mark Tully, Singh said about his Cambridge days:

I first became conscious of the creative role of politics in shaping human affairs, and I owe that mostly to my teachers Joan Robinson and Nicholas Kaldor. Joan Robinson was a brilliant teacher, but she also sought to awaken the inner conscience of her students in a manner that very few others were able to achieve. She questioned me a great deal and made me think the unthinkable. She propounded the left wing interpretation of Keynes, maintaining that the state has to play more of a role if you really want to combine development with social equity. Kaldor influenced me even more; I found him pragmatic, scintillating, stimulating. Joan Robinson was a great admirer of what was going on in China, but Kaldor used the Keynesian analysis to demonstrate that capitalism could be made to work.

After Cambridge, Singh returned to India and served as a teacher at Panjab University. In 1960, he went to the University of Oxford for his DPhil, where he was a member of Nuffield College. His 1962 doctoral thesis under the supervision of Ian Little was titled "India's export performance, 1951–1960, export prospects and policy implications", and was later the basis for his book "India's Export Trends and Prospects for Self-Sustained Growth".

== Early career ==
After completing his D.Phil., Singh returned to India. He was a senior lecturer of economics at Panjab University from 1957 to 1959. During 1959 and 1963, he served as a reader in economics at Panjab University, and from 1963 to 1965, he was an economics professor there. Then he went to work for the United Nations Conference on Trade and Development (UNCTAD) from 1966 to 1969. Later, he was appointed as an advisor to the Ministry of Foreign Trade by Lalit Narayan Mishra, in recognition of Singh's talent as an economist.

From 1969 to 1971, Singh was a professor of international trade at the Delhi School of Economics, University of Delhi.

In 1972, Singh was chief economic adviser in the Ministry of Finance, and in 1976 he was secretary in the Finance Ministry. In 1980–1982 he was at the Planning Commission, and in 1982, he was appointed governor of the Reserve Bank of India under then finance minister Pranab Mukherjee and held the post until 1985. He went on to become the deputy chairman of the Planning Commission (India) from 1985 to 1987. Following his tenure at the Planning Commission, he was secretary general of the South Commission, an independent economic policy think tank headquartered in Geneva, Switzerland from 1987 to November 1990.

Singh returned to India from Geneva in November 1990 and held the post as the advisor to Prime Minister of India on economic affairs during the tenure of Chandra Shekar. In March 1991, he became chairman of the University Grants Commission.

== Political career ==
In June 1991, India's prime minister at the time, P. V. Narasimha Rao, chose Singh to be his finance minister. Singh told Mark Tully, a British journalist, in 2005:

On the day (Rao) was formulating his cabinet, he sent his Principal Secretary to me saying, "The PM would like you to become the Minister of Finance". I didn't take it seriously. He eventually tracked me down the next morning, rather angry, and demanded that I get dressed up and come to Rashtrapati Bhavan for the swearing in. So that's how I started in politics[.]

=== Minister of Finance (1991–1996) ===
In 1991, India's fiscal deficit was close to 8.5 per cent of the gross domestic product, the balance of payments deficit was huge and the current account deficit was close to 3.5 per cent of India's GDP. India's foreign reserves barely amounted to US$1 billion, enough to pay for 2 weeks of imports, in comparison to US$600 billion in 2009.

Singh explained to the PM and the party that India is facing an unprecedented crisis. However the rank and file of the party resisted deregulation. So P. Chidambaram and Singh explained to the party that the economy would collapse if it was not deregulated. To the dismay of the party, Rao allowed Singh to deregulate the Indian economy.

Subsequently, Singh, who had thus far been one of the most influential architects of India's socialist economy, eliminated the license raj (which inhibited the prosperity of private businesses), reduced state control of the economy, and reduced import taxes. Rao and Singh thus implemented policies to open up the economy and change India's socialist economy to a more capitalistic one. They removed many obstacles standing in the way of Foreign Direct Investment (FDI) and initiated the process of the privatisation of public sector companies. However, in spite of these reforms, Rao's government was voted out in 1996 due to non-performance of government in other areas. In praise of Singh's work that pushed India towards a market economy, long-time cabinet minister P. Chidambaram has compared Singh's role in India's reforms to Deng Xiaoping's in China.

In 1993, Singh offered his resignation from the post of Finance Minister after a parliamentary investigation report criticised his ministry for not being able to anticipate a US$1.8 billion 1992 securities scandal. Prime Minister Rao refused Singh's resignation, instead promising to punish the individuals directly accused in the scandal.

=== Leader of Opposition in Rajya Sabha (1998–2004) ===
Singh was first elected to the upper house of Parliament, the Rajya Sabha, in 1991 by the legislature of the state of Assam, and was re-elected in 1995, 2001, 2007 and 2013. From 1998 to 2004, while the Bharatiya Janata Party was in power, Singh was the Leader of the Opposition in the Rajya Sabha. In 1999, he contested for the Lok Sabha from South Delhi but was unable to win the seat.

== Prime Minister (2004–2014) ==
=== First term (2004–2009) ===
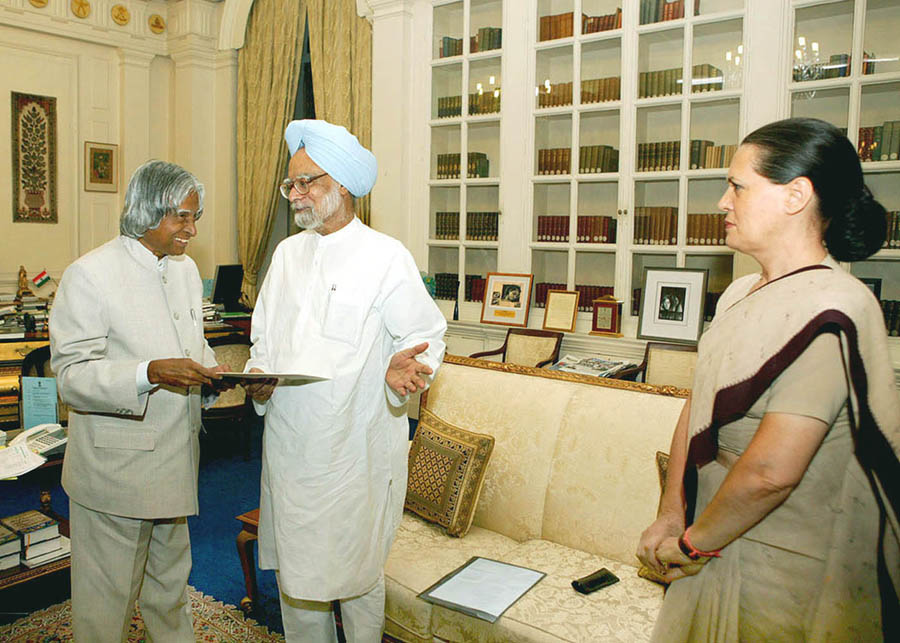
President of India A. P. J. Abdul Kalam authorising the Prime Minister designate Manmohan Singh to form the next Government in New Delhi on 19 May 2004

After the 2004 general elections, the Indian National Congress ended the incumbent National Democratic Alliance (NDA) tenure by becoming the political party with the single largest number of seats in the Lok Sabha. It formed United Progressive Alliance (UPA) with allies and staked claim to form government. In a surprise move, Chairperson Sonia Gandhi declared Manmohan Singh, a technocrat, as the UPA candidate for the prime ministership. Despite the fact that Singh had never won a direct popular election, according to the BBC, he "enjoyed massive popular support, not least because he was seen by many as a clean politician untouched by the taint of corruption that has run through many Indian administrations." He took the oath as the prime minister of India on 22 May 2004. Singh was the fourth PM to be from the Rajya Sabha, following Indira Gandhi (January 1966 - March 1967), H. D. Deve Gowda (June 1996 - April 1997) and Inder Kumar Gujral (April 1997- March 1998).

==== Economic policy ====
In 1991, Singh, as finance minister, abolished the Licence Raj, source of slow economic growth and corruption in the Indian economy for decades. He liberalised the Indian economy, allowing it to speed up development dramatically. During his term as prime minister, Singh continued to encourage growth in the Indian market, enjoying widespread success in these matters. Singh, along with his finance minister, P. Chidambaram, presided over a period where the Indian economy grew with an 8–9% economic growth rate. In 2007, India achieved its highest GDP growth rate of 9% and became the second fastest growing major economy in the world. Singh's ministry enacted a National Employment Guarantee Act (MGNREGA) in 2005.

Singh's government continued the Golden Quadrilateral and the highway modernisation program that was initiated by Vajpayee's government. Singh also worked on reforming the banking and financial sectors, as well as public sector companies. The Finance ministry worked towards relieving farmers of their debt and worked towards pro-industry policies. In 2005, Singh's government introduced the value added tax, replacing sales tax. In 2007 and early 2008, the Great Recession impacted India.

==== Healthcare and education ====
In 2005, Prime Minister Singh and his government's health ministry started the National Rural Health Mission (NHRM), which mobilised half a million community health workers. This rural health initiative was praised by the American economist Jeffrey Sachs. In 2006, his Government implemented the proposal to reserve 27% of seats in All India Institute of Medical Studies (AIIMS), Indian Institutes of Technology (IITs), the Indian Institutes of Management (IIMs) and other central institutions of higher education for Other Backward Classes which led to 2006 Indian anti-reservation protests.

On 2 July 2009, Singh ministry introduced the Right to Education Act (RTE) act. Eight IITs were opened in the states of Andhra Pradesh, Bihar, Gujarat, Orissa, Punjab, Madhya Pradesh, Rajasthan and Himachal Pradesh. The Singh government also continued the Sarva Shiksha Abhiyan program. The program includes the introduction and improvement of mid-day meals and the opening of schools all over India, especially in rural areas, to fight illiteracy.

==== Home affairs ====
Singh's government strengthened anti-terror laws with amendments to Unlawful Activities (Prevention) Act (UAPA). National Investigation Agency (NIA) was also created soon after the 2008 Mumbai terror attacks, as need for a central agency to combat terrorism was realised. Also, Unique Identification Authority of India was established in February 2009, an agency responsible for implementing the envisioned Multipurpose National Identity Card with the objective of increasing national security and facilitating e-governance.

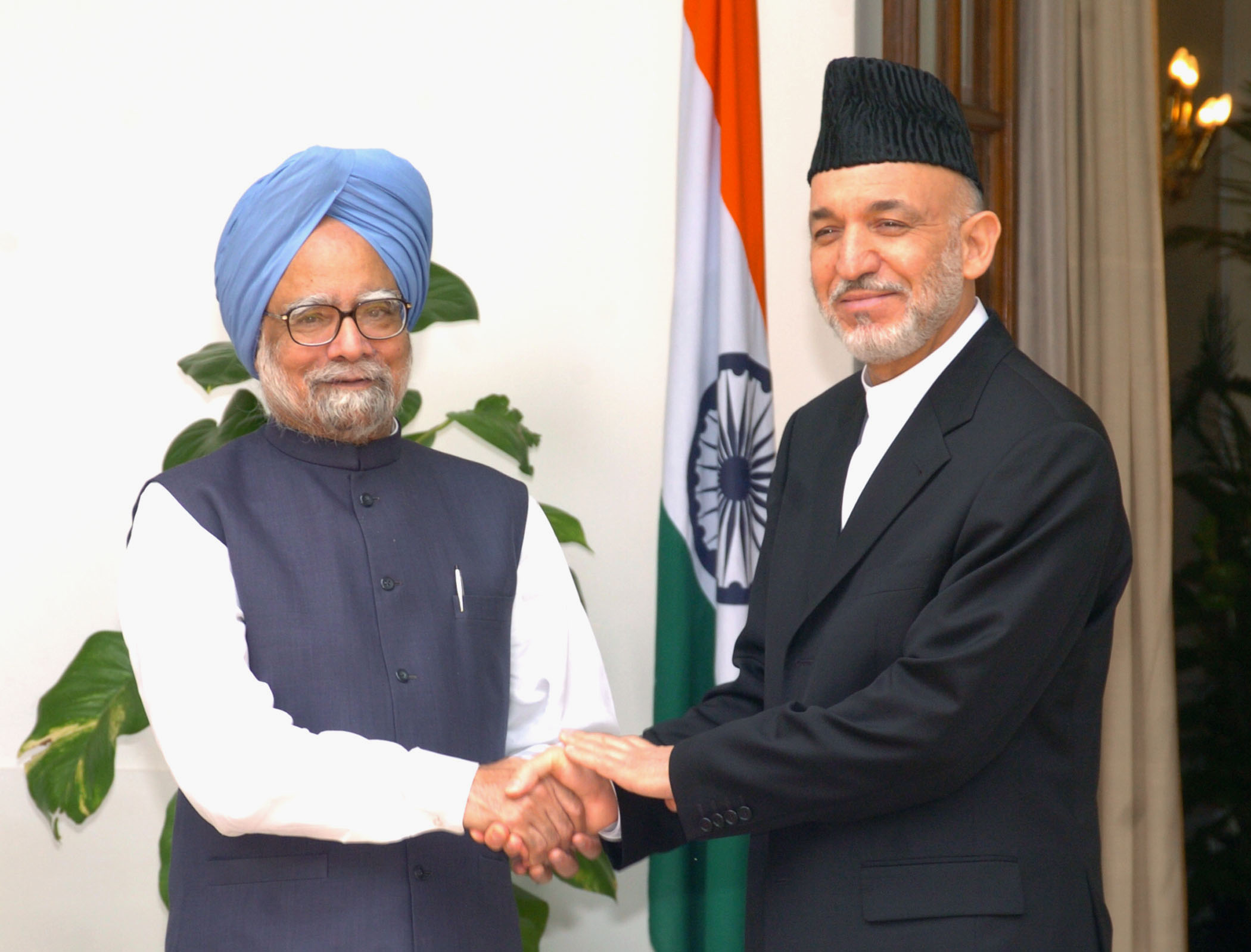
Singh with Afghan President Hamid Karzai in August 2008

Singh's administration initiated a massive reconstruction effort in Kashmir to stabilise the region but after some period of success, insurgent infiltration and terrorism in Kashmir has increased since 2009. The Singh administration was, however, successful in reducing terrorism in Northeast India.

In 2005, he controversially apologised on behalf of the Indian National Congress for the bloodshed during the 1984 anti-Sikh riots in a speech to Parliament.

==== Notable legislation ====
The important National Rural Employment Guarantee Act (NREGA) and the Right to Information Act were passed by the Parliament in 2005 during his tenure. While the effectiveness of the NREGA has been successful at various degrees, in various regions, the RTI act has proved crucial in India's fight against corruption. New cash benefits were also introduced for widows, pregnant women, and landless persons.

The Right to Fair Compensation and Transparency in Land Acquisition, Rehabilitation and Resettlement Act, 2013 was passed on 29 August 2013 in the Lok Sabha (lower house of the Indian parliament) and on 4 September 2013 in Rajya Sabha (upper house of the Indian parliament). The bill received the assent of the president of India, Pranab Mukherjee on 27 September 2013. The Act came into force from 1 January 2014.

Right of Children to Free and Compulsory Education Act was enacted on 4 August 2009, which describes the modalities of the importance of free and compulsory education for children between 6 and 14 in India under Article 21A of the Indian Constitution. India became one of 135 countries to make education a fundamental right of every child when the act came into force on 1 April 2010.

==== Foreign policy ====
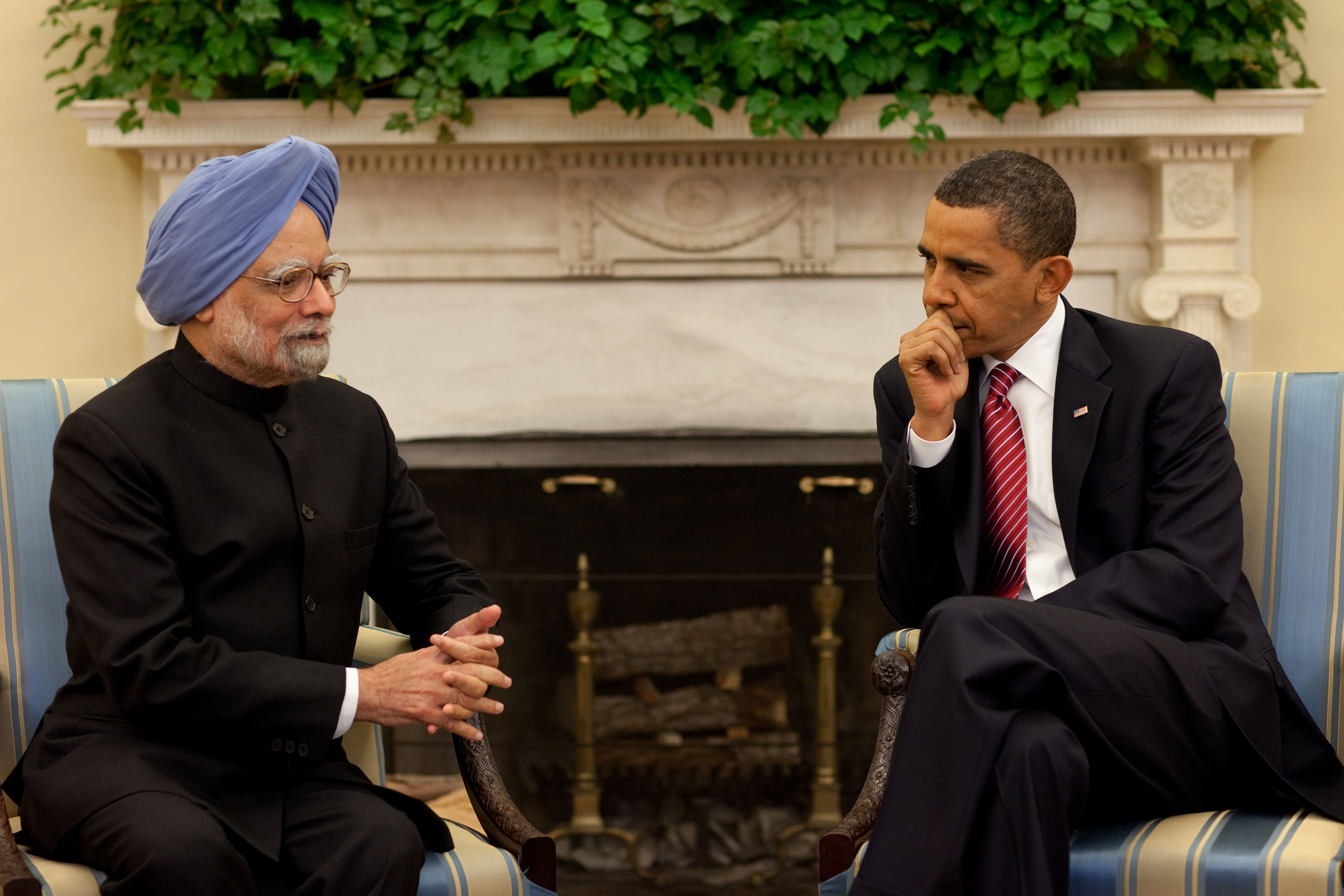

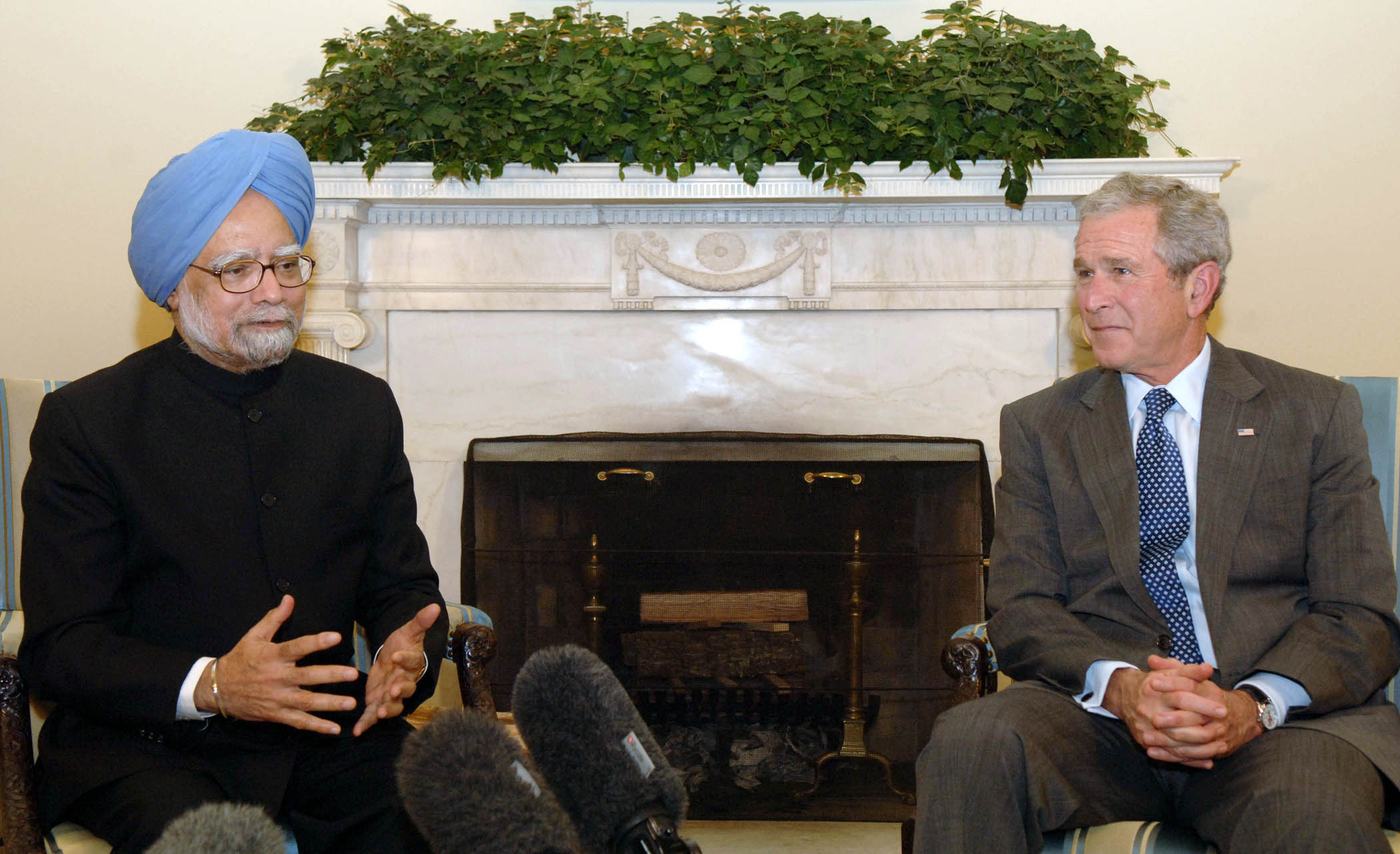
Singh with American presidents, Barack Obama and George W. Bush, at the White House

Manmohan Singh continued the pragmatic foreign policy that was started by P.V. Narasimha Rao and continued by Bharatiya Janata Party's Atal Bihari Vajpayee. Singh continued the peace process with Pakistan initiated by his predecessor, Atal Bihari Vajpayee. Exchange of high-level visits by top leaders from both countries have highlighted his tenure. Efforts have been made during Singh's tenure to end the border dispute with People's Republic of China. In November 2006, Chinese president Hu Jintao visited India which was followed by Singh's visit to Beijing in January 2008. A major development in Sino-Indian relations was the reopening of the Nathula Pass in 2006 after being closed for more than four decades. Premier of the State Council of the People's Republic of China, Li Keqiang paid a state visit to India (Delhi-Mumbai) from 19 to 21 May 2013. Singh paid an official visit to China from 22 to 24 October 2013. Three agreements were signed establishing sister-city partnership between Delhi-Beijing, Kolkata-Kunming and Bangalore-Chengdu. As of 2010, the People's Republic of China was the second biggest trade partner of India.

Relations with Afghanistan have improved considerably, with India now becoming the largest regional donor to Afghanistan. During Afghan President Hamid Karzai's visit to New Delhi in August 2008, Manmohan Singh increased the aid package to Afghanistan for the development of more schools, health clinics, infrastructure, and defence. Under the leadership of Singh, India emerged as one of the single largest aid donors to Afghanistan.

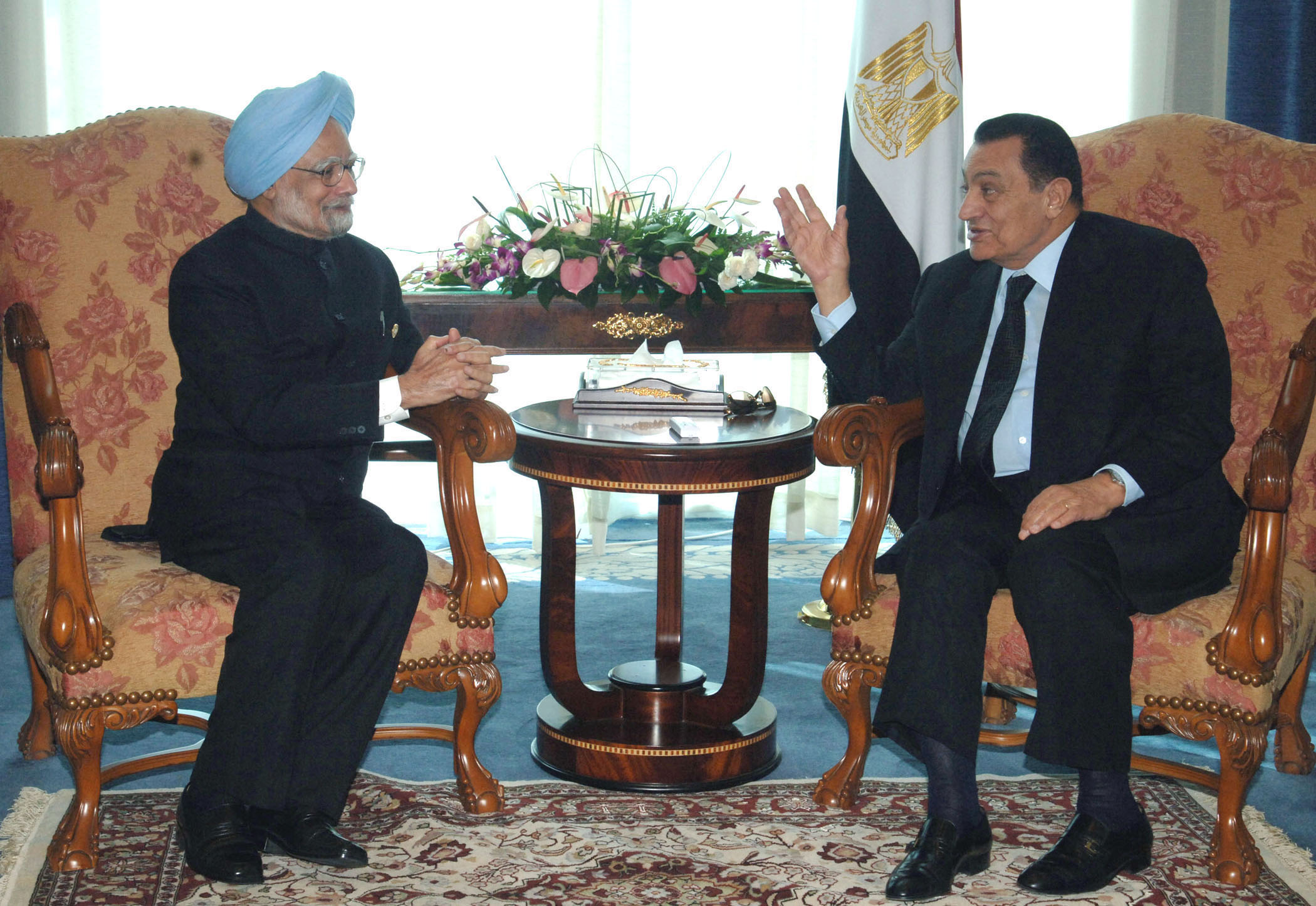
Singh with Egyptian president Hosni Mubarak on the sideline of the 15th NAM Summit, at Sharm El Sheikh, Egypt, July 2009

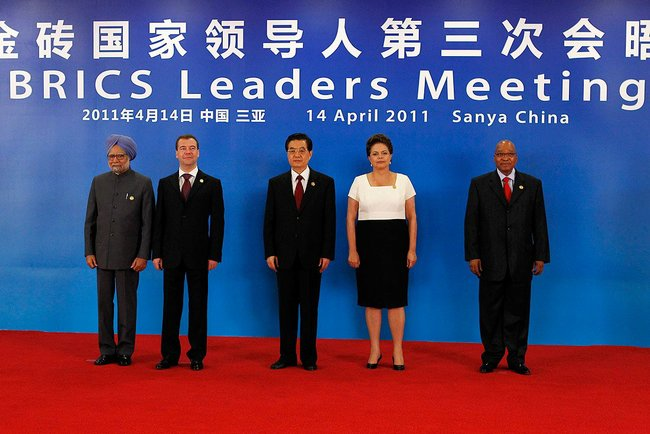
Prime Minister Manmohan Singh with Dmitry Medvedev, Hu Jintao, Dilma Rousseff and Jacob Zuma at the 2011 BRICS summit in Sanya, China

Singh's government worked towards stronger ties with the United States. He visited the United States in July 2005 initiating negotiations over the Indo-US civilian nuclear agreement. This was followed by George W. Bush's successful visit to India in March 2006, during which the declaration over the nuclear agreement was made, giving India access to American nuclear fuel and technology while India will have to allow IAEA inspection of its civil nuclear reactors. After more than two years for more negotiations, followed by approval from the IAEA, Nuclear Suppliers Group and the US Congress, India and the US signed the agreement on 10 October 2008 with Pranab Mukherjee representing India. Singh had the first official state visit to the White House during the administration of US president Barack Obama. The visit took place in November 2009, and several discussions took place, including on trade and nuclear power.

Relations improved with Japan and European Union countries, like the United Kingdom, France, and Germany. Relations with Iran continued and negotiations over the Iran-Pakistan-India gas pipeline have taken place. New Delhi hosted an India–Africa Summit in April 2006 which was attended by the leaders of 15 African states. Relations have improved with other developing countries, particularly Brazil and South Africa. Singh carried forward the momentum which was established after the "Brasilia Declaration" in 2003 and the IBSA Dialogue Forum was formed.

Singh's government was especially keen on expanding ties with Israel. From 2003, the two countries made significant investments in each other, making Israel a rival to Russia to become India's largest defence partner. Though there have been a few diplomatic glitches between India and Russia, especially over the delay and price hike of several Russian weapons to be delivered to India, relations between the two remained strong with India and Russia signing various agreements to increase defence, nuclear energy and space co-operation.

During the Libyan Civil War, India abstained from voting on the UN Security Council's Resolutions 1970 and 1973 that authorised NATO action in Libya. In Lok Sabha, resolution was unanimously adopted to condemn NATO's military intervention in Libya.

In 2009, Singh was among the leaders who laid the foundation of the BRICS. The establishment of the group is often described as a display of emergent economic power.

Singh criticised the West for the use of force to enforce regime change in Syria and Libya during his speech at the UN in September 2011. India was silent over the killing of Gaddafi. Although India was among the last few countries to recognise the Libyan National Transitional Council, it agreed to work with the Council to help rebuild Libya. India resent an ambassador to Tripoli in July 2012 having shut its mission in Tripoli in 2011.

=== Second term (2009–2014) ===
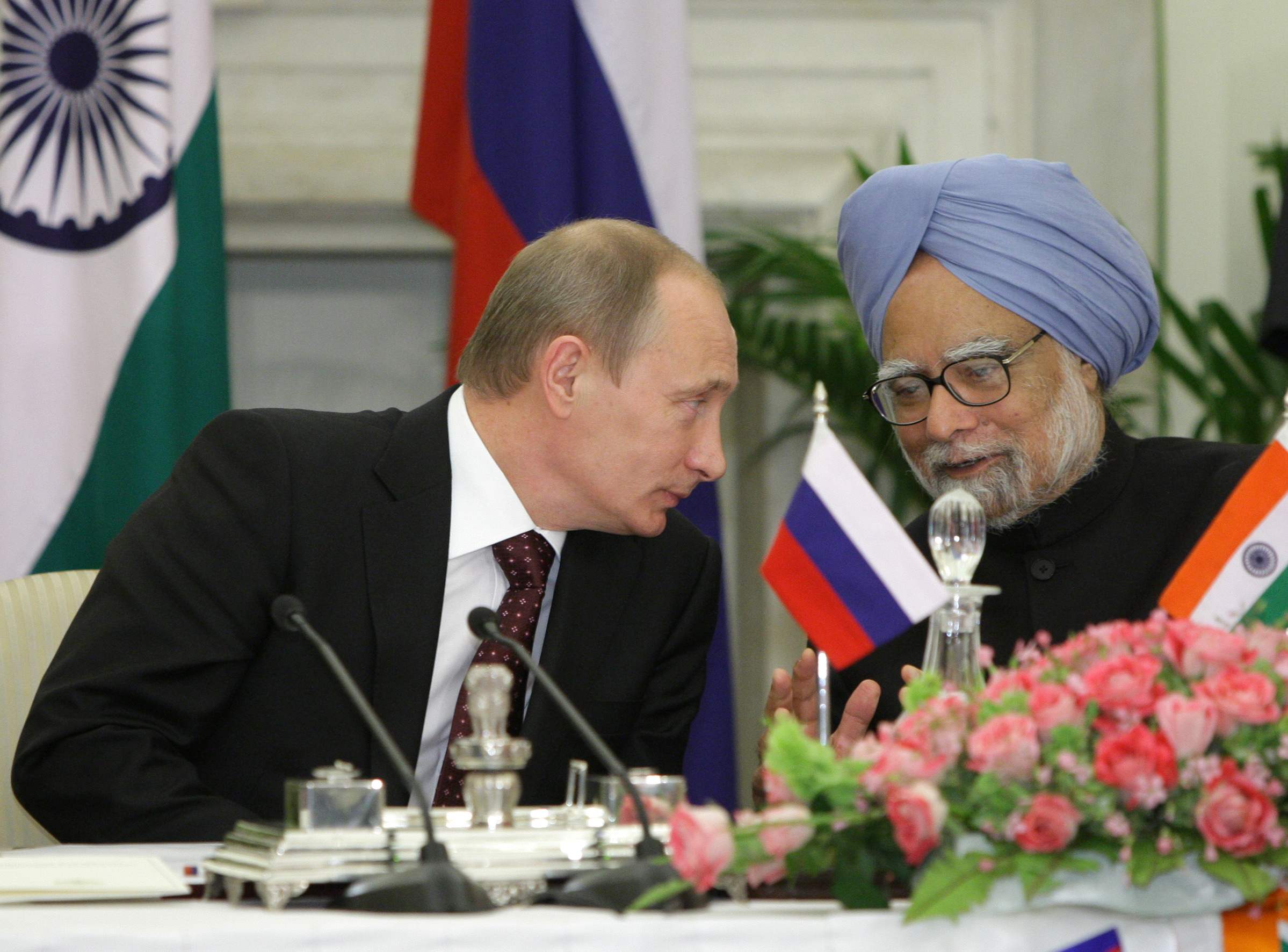
Singh with Russian prime minister Vladimir Putin in March 2010

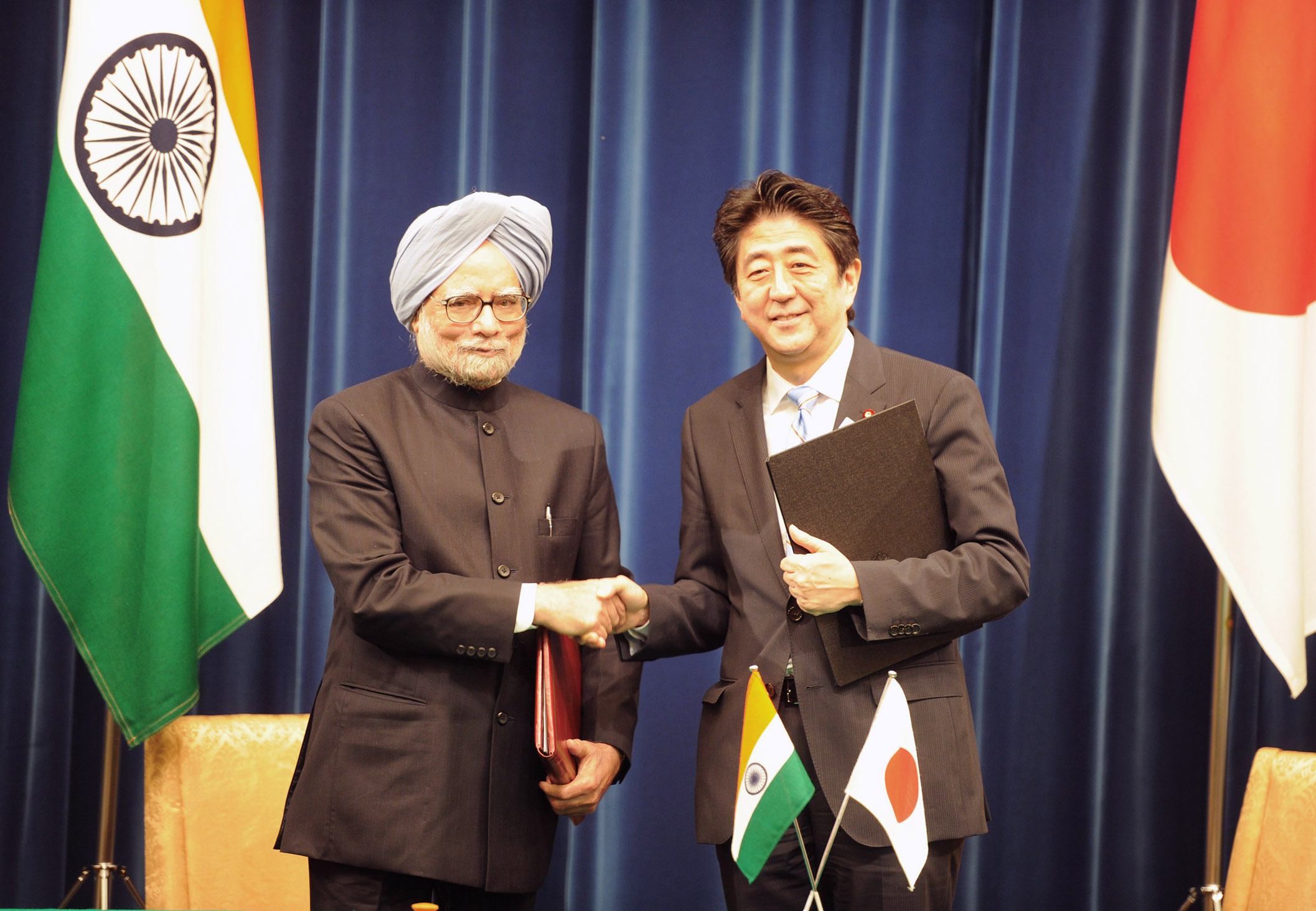
Singh with Japanese prime minister Shinzo Abe in May 2013

India held general elections to the 15th Lok Sabha in five phases between 16 April 2009 and 13 May 2009. The results of the election were announced on 16 May 2009. Strong showings in Andhra Pradesh, Rajasthan, Maharashtra, Tamil Nadu, Kerala, West Bengal and Uttar Pradesh helped the United Progressive Alliance (UPA) form the new government under the incumbent Singh, who became the first prime minister since Jawaharlal Nehru in 1962 to win re-election after completing a full five-year term. The Congress and its allies were able to put together a comfortable majority with support from 322 members out of 543 members of the House. These included those of the UPA and the external support from the Bahujan Samaj Party (BSP), Samajwadi Party (SP), Janata Dal (Secular) (JD(S)), Rashtriya Janata Dal (RJD) and other minor parties.

On 22 May 2009, Manmohan Singh was sworn in as the prime minister during a ceremony held at Rashtrapati Bhavan.

In his second term, Singh's government was involved in political scandals such as the 2G spectrum case and the Commonwealth Games scandal. Singh declined to appear before a Joint Parliamentary Committee (JPC) in April 2013 when called upon by one of the members of JPC Yashwant Sinha for his alleged involvement in the 2G case. In 2017, all of the accused were acquitted in the 2G case. Following this verdict, the Congress stated the "BJP has been exposed for its untruth and propaganda against Congress," and urged Narendra Modi and Arun Jaitley "to apologise to the nation".

Following the 2012 Delhi gang rape and murder, Singh appealed for calm, stressing that "violence will serve no purpose". In a televised address, he assured that all possible efforts would be made to ensure the safety of women in India. Singh expressed empathy, saying: "As a father of three daughters I feel as strongly about the incident as each one of you". As a tribute to the victim, the prime minister cancelled all his official events to celebrate the new year.

The 2012 report filed by the CAG in Parliament of India states that due to the allocation of coal blocks to certain private companies without bidding process the nation suffered an estimated loss of Rs 1.85 trillion (short scale) between 2005 and 2009 in which Manmohan Singh was the coal minister of India. On 29 July 2026, the Supreme Court of India accepted the Central Bureau of Investigation's closure report giving a clean chit to Singh and others in the coal block allocation case.

Singh's policy also led to the Real estate crisis of 2011-12 in which crony corporation's such as Unitech, Jaypee went bankrupt, it was triggered by aggressive monetary tightening by the Reserve Bank of India (RBI), soaring home loan interest rates, rising non-performing assets (NPAs), and a withdrawal of post-2008 fiscal stimulus.

Singh's policy of Oil Bond is considered a financial scam, These bonds were issued to finance the subsidy given on some petroleum products to cover the difference between the purchase price by the oil companies and the reduced price which were forced by his government to sell.

Singh's government had an approval rating of 30% by 2013.

== Post-premiership (2014–2024) ==
Singh's premiership officially ended at noon on 17 May 2014. He did not contest the 2014 general election for the 16th Lok Sabha as the prime ministerial candidate. He resigned his post as prime minister after the Bharatiya Janata Party-led National Democratic Alliance won the election. He served as the acting prime minister till 26 May 2014, when Narendra Modi was sworn in as the new prime minister. Singh, along with Congress president Sonia Gandhi, former presidents A. P. J. Abdul Kalam and Pratibha Patil, and Vice-President Hamid Ansari attended Modi's swearing-in ceremony.

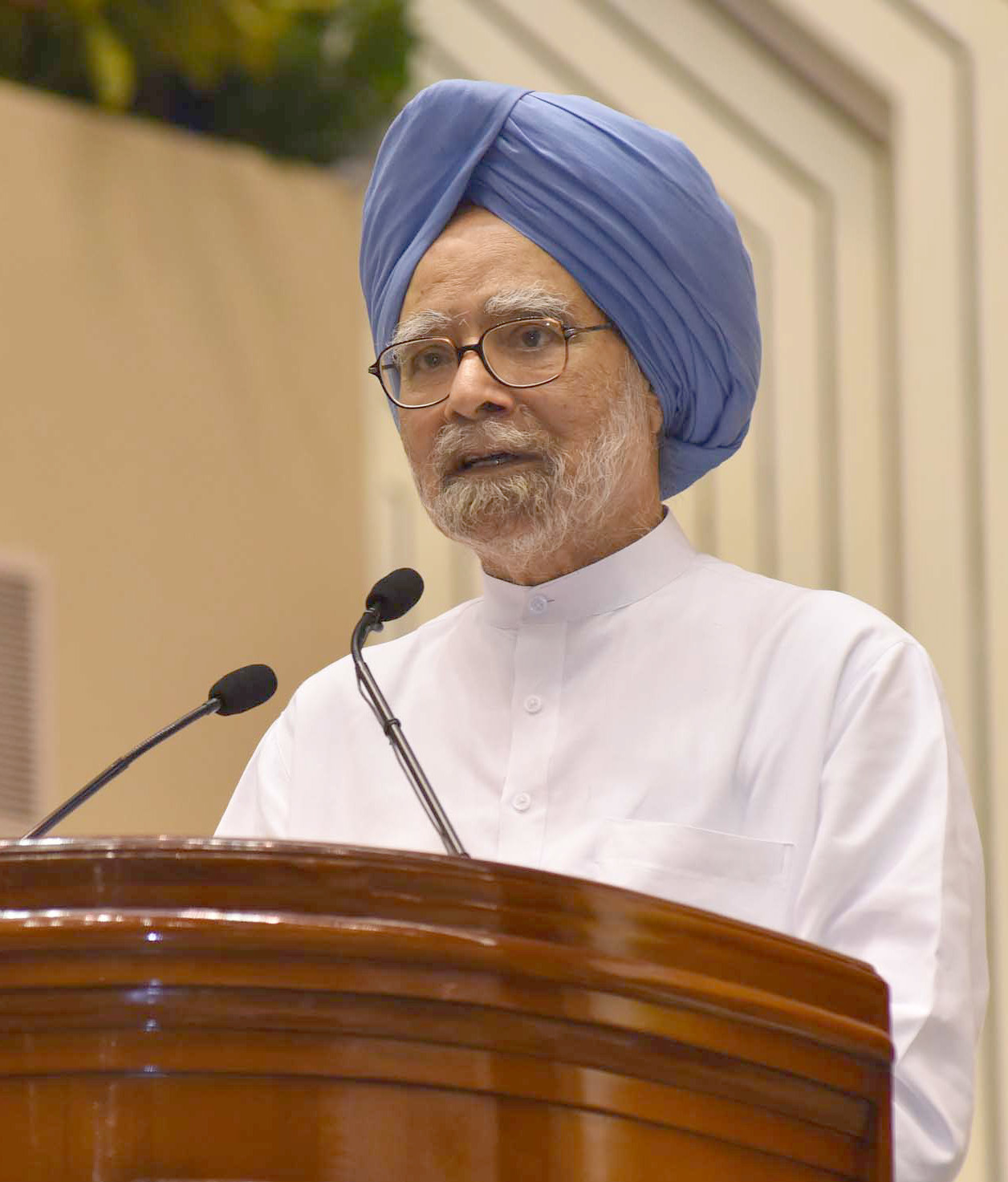
In September 2018, Singh delivered a book speech.

In 2016, it was announced that Singh was to take up a position at Panjab University as the Jawaharlal Nehru Chair, which he eventually did not. He was elected as the Rajya Sabha MP for Rajasthan in 2019, succeeding BJP MP Madan Lal Saini. Singh retired from the Rajya Sabha in April 2024 and was succeeded by Sonia Gandhi.

== Public image and legacy ==
The Independent described Singh as "one of the world's most revered leaders" and "a man of uncommon decency and grace", noting that he drives a Maruti 800, one of the humblest cars in the Indian market. Khushwant Singh lauded Singh as the best prime minister India has had, even rating him higher than Jawaharlal Nehru. He mentions an incident in his book Absolute Khushwant: The Low-Down on Life, Death and Most things In-between where after losing the 1999 Lok Sabha elections, Singh immediately returned the ₹2 lakh (US$2,100) he had borrowed from the writer for hiring taxis. Terming him as the best example of integrity, Khushwant Singh stated, "When people talk of integrity, I say the best example is the man who occupies the country's highest office."

In 2010, Newsweek magazine recognised him as a world leader who is respected by other heads of state, describing him as "the leader other leaders love." The article quoted Mohamed ElBaradei, who remarked that Singh is "the model of what a political leader should be." Singh also received the World Statesman Award in 2010. Henry Kissinger described Singh as "a statesman with vision, persistence and integrity", and praised him for his "leadership, which has been instrumental in the economic transformation underway in India."

Singh was ranked 18 on the 2010 Forbes list of the World's Most Powerful People. Forbes magazine described Singh as being "universally praised as India's best prime minister since Nehru". Australian journalist Greg Sheridan praised Singh "as one of the greatest statesmen in Asian history." Singh was later ranked 19 and 28 in 2012 and 2013 in the Forbes list. Time magazine described Singh as "guiding India into the ranks of the great powers".

Conversely, Time magazine's Asia edition for 10–17 July 2012, on its cover remarked that Singh was an "underachiever". It stated that Singh appears "unwilling to stick his neck out" on reforms that will put the country back onto a growth path. Congress spokesperson Manish Tewari rebutted the charges. UPA ally Lalu Prasad Yadav took issue with the magazine's statements. Praising the government, Prasad said UPA projects [were] doing well and asked, "What will America say as their own economy is shattered?". Additionally, Singh faced negative reception following the 2008 Mumbai attacks for falling short on enhancing national security.

In his 2020 memoir A Promised Land, former US president Barack Obama called Singh "Wise, thoughtful, and scrupulously honest".

Political opponents, including BJP co-founder L. K. Advani, have claimed that Singh is a "weak" prime minister. Advani declared "He is weak. What do I call a person who can't take his decisions until 10 Janpath gives instruction." Arvind Kejriwal in 2018 said the people are "missing an educated PM like Dr Manmohan Singh". In 2022, Union Transport Minister of Modi Government, Nitin Gadkari said the "country is indebted to Manmohan Singh for the liberalisation that gave a new direction".

In 2013, BJP leader Narendra Modi had termed Singh as "night watchman" and a "puppet of the Gandhi family". On 8 February 2024, Modi praised Manmohan Singh stating,

Ideological differences are short lived, but the way Manmohan Singh has guided this House and the country for such a long period, he will be remembered for his contributions during every discussion on our democracy.

Modi also recalled when Singh arrived at the Parliament in a wheelchair to cast his vote over a key legislation.

Following his death, Prime Minister Narendra Modi called Singh one of "India's most distinguished leaders" and declared national mourning. President Droupadi Murmu, Vice-President Jagdeep Dhankhar, Opposition Leader Rahul Gandhi, Home Affairs Minister Amit Shah, Defence Minister Rajnath Singh and former prime minister H. D. Deve Gowda issued statements praising Singh and his leadership after his death. Mauritius and Bhutan flew their flags at half-mast to mourn the death of Singh.

== Family and personal life ==
Singh married Gursharan Kaur in 1958. They had three daughters, Upinder Singh, Daman Singh and Amrit Singh. Upinder Singh is a professor of history at Ashoka University. Daman Singh is a graduate of St. Stephen's College, Delhi and Institute of Rural Management, Anand, Gujarat, and author of The Last Frontier: People and Forests in Mizoram and a novel, Nine by Nine, Amrit Singh is a staff attorney at the American Civil Liberties Union. Singh's son-in-law, Ashok Pattnaik, a 1983 batch Indian Police Service officer, was appointed CEO of National Intelligence Grid (NATGRID) in 2016.

Singh was attacked during the 1984 Anti-Sikh riots and provided financial assistance to the Citizens' Relief Committee, and was a member of The Sikh Forum.

Singh was a vegetarian.

Until his death, Singh resided at 3, Motilal Nehru Marg in New Delhi.

== Illness and death ==
Singh underwent multiple cardiac bypass surgeries, the last of which took place in January 2009. In May 2020, Singh was hospitalised at the All India Institute of Medical Sciences (AIIMS) due to a negative reaction from his medication. In April 2021, Singh was hospitalised after testing positive for COVID-19. In October 2021, Singh was hospitalised again at the AIIMS after experiencing weakness and fever.

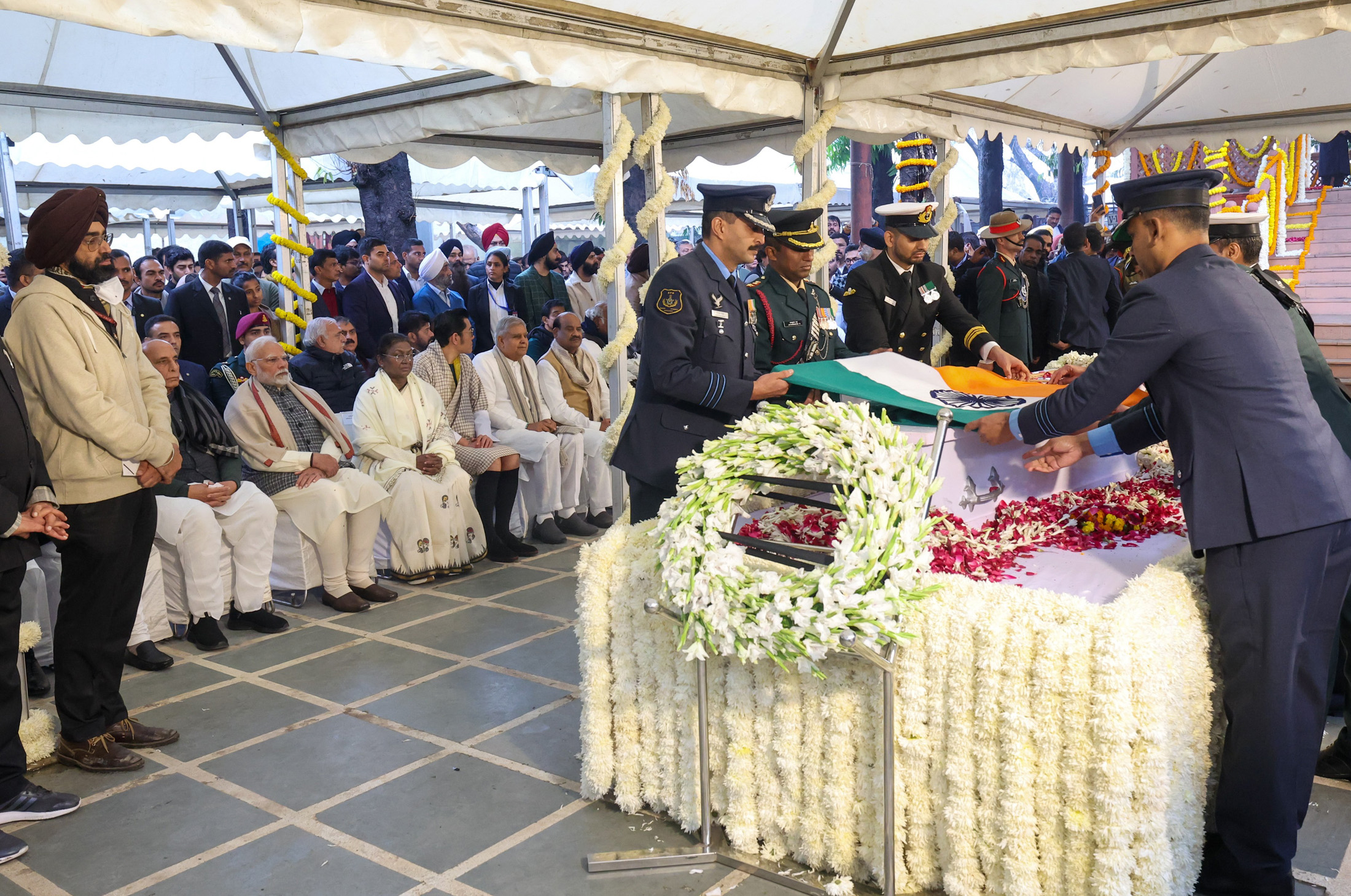
Prime Minister Narendra Modi attending last rites of Dr. Manmohan Singh along with the President of India

On 26 December 2024, Singh collapsed at his home in New Delhi and was admitted to the emergency department of AIIMS Delhi. Singh died a few hours after his hospitalisation at the age of 92. The government subsequently announced a period of national mourning until 1 January 2025 and accorded Singh a state funeral at his cremation at Nigam Bodh Ghat, New Delhi on 28 December.

== Electoral history ==
=== Lok Sabha ===
Year	Election	Party	Constituency Name	Result	Votes	Vote share%
1999	13th Lok Sabha	INC	South Delhi	Lost	2,31,231	46.25

=== Rajya Sabha ===
Position	Party	Constituency	From	To	Tenure
Member of Parliament, Rajya Sabha (1st Term)	INC	Assam	1 October 1991	14 June 1995	3 years, 256 days
Member of Parliament, Rajya Sabha (2nd Term)	INC	Assam	15 June 1995	14 June 2001	5 years, 364 days
Member of Parliament, Rajya Sabha (3rd Term)	INC	Assam	15 June 2001	14 June 2007	5 years, 364 days
Member of Parliament, Rajya Sabha (4th Term)	INC	Assam	15 June 2007	14 June 2013	5 years, 364 days
Member of Parliament, Rajya Sabha (5th Term)	INC	Assam	15 June 2013	14 June 2019	5 years, 364 days
Member of Parliament, Rajya Sabha (6th Term)	INC	Rajasthan	20 August 2019	3 April 2024	4 years, 227 days

== In popular culture ==
A Bollywood film was made in 2019 based on Singh's life, titled The Accidental Prime Minister directed by Vijay Gutte and written by Mayank Tewari with Anupam Kher in the titular role. The film was based on the 2014 memoir of the same name by Sanjaya Baru.

Pradhanmantri (lit. 'Prime Minister'), a 2013 Indian documentary television series which aired on ABP News and covers the various policies and political tenures of Indian PMs, includes the tenure of Manmohan Singh in the episodes "Story of Sonia Gandhi and UPA-I Government", and "Scams in UPA government and anti-corruption movement".

== See also ==
- Economic reforms under Manmohan Singh

== Notes ==
Political offices
Preceded by Atal Bihari Vajpayee	Prime Minister of India; 22 May 2004 – 26 May 2014	Succeeded by Narendra Modi

Political offices
Preceded by Indraprasad Gordhanbhai Patel	Governor of the Reserve Bank; 16 September 1982 – 14 January 1985	Succeeded by Amitav Ghosh
Preceded by Narasimha Rao	Deputy Chairman of the Planning Commission; 15 January 1985 – 31 August 1987	Succeeded by Punjala Shiv Shankar
Preceded by Yashwant Sinha	Union Minister of Finance; 21 June 1991 – 16 May 1996	Succeeded by Jaswant Singh
Preceded by Atal Bihari Vajpayee	Prime Minister of India; 22 May 2004 – 26 May 2014	Succeeded by Narendra Modi
Preceded by Atal Bihari Vajpayee	Chairperson of the Planning Commission; 22 May 2004 – 26 May 2014	Succeeded by Narendra Modi
Preceded by Kunwar Natwar Singh	Union Minister of External Affairs; 6 November 2005 – 24 October 2006	Succeeded by Pranab Mukherjee
Preceded by Palaniappan Chidambaram	Union Minister of Finance; 30 November 2008 – 24 January 2009	Succeeded by Pranab Mukherjee
Preceded by Pranab Mukherjee	Union Minister of Finance; 26 June 2012 – 31 July 2012	Succeeded by Palaniappan Chidambaram
Diplomatic posts
Preceded by Khaleda Zia	Chairperson of SAARC; 3 April 2007 – 31 July 2008	Succeeded by Mahinda Rajapaksa
