= Dental Council of India =

Organization created under Government of India to regulate the Dental colleges

- Abbreviation: DCI
- Successor: National Dental Commission
- Formation: 12 April 1949; 77 years ago
- Dissolved: 19 March 2026; 7 months ago
- Type: Statutory body
- Legal status: Abolished
- Purpose: To regulate dental education in India and to grant Colleges, Universities, and also for registration of dental degree holders and monitoring dental practice.
- Headquarters: New Delhi, India
- Main organ: Council
- Parent organization: Ministry of Health and Family Welfare
- Website: www.dciindia.gov.in

The Dental Council of India was a statutory body incorporated under The Dentists Act, 1948 to regulate dental education and the profession throughout India until its dissolution on 19th March 2026 when it was replaced by National Dental Commission. It was financed by the Ministry of Health and Family Welfare and through the local state dental councils.

This transition mirrors the earlier overhaul of the Dental education regulator (where the DCI was replaced by the National Dental Commission). The restructuring replaces the previous elected governance system with a modern, merit-based framework consisting of three specialized autonomous boards i.e. Undergraduate and Postgraduate Dental Education Board, Dental Assessment and Rating Board & Ethics and Dental Registration Board.

The National Dental Commission Bill, 2023 was passed by the Indian Parliament in July and August 2023, replacing the old Dental Council of India.

== Objectives ==
- Maintain uniform standards of dental education in India
- Regulate the curriculum in the training of dentists, dental hygienists and dental mechanics
- Regulate the level of examinations and qualifications

== Function ==
The Dental Council of India is constituted by an act of parliament 'The Dentists Act 1948' (XVI of 1948) with a view to regulate the dental education, dental profession and dental ethics thereto-which came into existence in March 1949.

The Council is composed of 6 constituencies representing Central Government, State Government, Universities, Dental Colleges, Medical Council of India and the Private Practitioners of Dentistry. The Director-General of Health Services is Ex-Officio Member – both of the Executive Committee and General Body. The Council elects from themselves the President, Vice-President and the members of the Executive Committee. The elected President and the Vice-President are the Ex-Officio Chairman and Vice Chairman of the Executive Committee. The Executive Committee is the governing body of this organization, which deals with all procedural, financial and day-to-day activities and affairs of the Council. The Council is financed mainly by grants from the Govt. of India, Ministry of Health & Family Welfare (Department of Health) though the other source of income of the Council is the 1/4th share of fees realized every year by various State Dental Councils under section 53 of the Dentists Act, Inspection fee from the various Dental Institution for Inspecting under Section 15 of the Dentists Act, 1948 and application fee from the organization to apply for permission to set up new Dental College, opening of higher Courses of study and increase of admission capacity in Dental Colleges under section 10A of the Dentists Act, 1948 as amended by the Dentists (Amendment) Act, 1993.

== Future ==
A Bill has been introduced in the Parliament of India to dissolve the Dental Council of India, along with other Regulatory Bodies such as the Medical Council of India, Nursing Council of India and Pharmacy Council of India. In January 2020, the Union Ministry of Health and Family Welfare put in the public domain the draft National Dental Commission Bill, a bill aimed at replacing the Dental Council of India and replacing it with National Dental Commission. These Regulatory Bodies are proposed to be replaced with a common Statutory Body known as National Commission for Human Resources for Health. This is primarily due to widespread allegations of corruption in the Dental Council of India, and raids conducted by Central Bureau of Investigation on Anil Kohli, tainted ex-President of Dental Council of India and Ketan Desai, tainted ex-President of Medical Council of India.
