= ZGB =

ZGB may refer to:

- Swiss Civil Code
- Zabergäu-Gymnasium Brackenheim, school in Germany
- The Ziff–Gulari–Barshad model in chemical physics for the catalytic oxidation of carbon monoxide
