= Epidemic models on lattices =

Spatial SIR model simulation. Each cell can infect its eight immediate neighbors.

Classic epidemic models of disease transmission are described in Compartmental models in epidemiology. Here we discuss the behavior when such models are simulated on a lattice. Lattice models, which were first explored in the context of cellular automata, act as good first approximations of more complex spatial configurations, although they do not reflect the heterogeneity of space (e.g. population density differences, urban geography and topographical differentiations). Lattice-based epidemic models can also be implemented as fixed agent-based models.

== Introduction ==
The mathematical modelling of epidemics was originally implemented in terms of differential equations, which effectively assumed that the various states of individuals were uniformly distributed throughout space. To take into account correlations and clustering, lattice-based models have been introduced. Grassberger considered synchronous (cellular automaton) versions of models, and showed how the epidemic growth goes through a critical behavior such that transmission remains local when infection rates are below critical values, and spread throughout the system when they are above a critical value. Cardy and Grassberger argued that this growth is similar to the growth of percolation clusters, which are governed by the "dynamical percolation" universality class (finished clusters are in the same class as static percolation, while growing clusters have additional dynamic exponents). In asynchronous models, the individuals are considered one at a time, as in kinetic Monte Carlo or as a "Stochastic Lattice Gas."

== SIR model ==
In the "SIR" model, there are three states:

- Susceptible (S) -- has not yet been infected, and has no immunity
- Infected (I)-- currently "sick" and contagious to Susceptible neighbors
- Removed (R), where the removal from further participation in the process is assumed to be permanent, due to immunization or death

It is to be distinguished from the "SIS" model, where sites recover without immunization, and are thus not "removed".

The asynchronous simulation of the model on a lattice is carried out as follows:

- Pick a site. If it is I, then generate a random number x in (0,1).
- If x < c then let I go to R.
- Otherwise, pick one nearest neighbor randomly. If the neighboring site is S, then let it become I.
- Repeat as long as there are S sites available.

Making a list of I sites makes this run quickly.

The net rate of infecting one neighbor over the rate of removal is λ = (1-c)/c.

For the synchronous model, all sites are updated simultaneously (using two copies of the lattice) as in a cellular automaton.

Lattice	z	c_{c}	λ_{c} = (1 - c_{c})/c_{c}
2-d asynchronous SIR model triangular lattice	6	0.199727(6)	4.0068(2)
2-d asynchronous SIR model square lattice	4	0.1765(5), 0.1765005(10)	4.66571(3)
2-d asynchronous SIR model honeycomb lattice	3	0.1393(1)	6.179(5)
2-d synchronous SIR model square lattice	4	0.22	3.55
2-d asynchronous SIR model on Penrose lattice		0.1713(2)	
2-d asynchronous SIR model on Ammann-Beenker lattice		0.1732(5)	
2-d asynchronous SIR model on random Delaunay triangulations		0.1963(3)	

== Contact process (asynchronous SIS model) ==
I → S with unit rate; S → I with rate λn_{I}/z where n_{I} is the number of nearest neighbor I sites, and z is the total number of nearest neighbors (equivalently, each I attempts to infect one neighboring site with rate λ)

(Note: S → I with rate λn in some definitions, implying that lambda has one-fourth the values given here).

The simulation of the asynchronous model on a lattice is carried out as follows, with c = 1 / (1 + λ):

- Pick a site. If it is I, then generate a random number x in (0,1).

- If x < c then let I go to S.

- Otherwise, pick one nearest neighbor randomly. If the neighboring site is S, then let it become I.
- Repeat

Note that the synchronous version is related to the directed percolation model.

Lattice	z	λ_{c}
1-d	2	3.2978(2), 3.29785(2)
2-d square lattice	4	1.6488(1), 1.64874(2), 1.64872(3), 1.64877(3)
2-d triangular lattice	6	1.54780(5)
2-d Delaunay triangulation of Voronoi Diagram	6 (av)	1.54266(4)
3-d cubic lattice	6	1.31685(10), 1.31683(2), 1.31686(1)
4-d hypercubic lattice	8	1.19511(1)
5-d hypercubic lattice	10	1.13847(1)

== See also ==
- Mathematical modelling of infectious disease
- Compartmental models in epidemiology
- Epidemic model
- Percolation
- Percolation threshold
- Percolation theory
- 2D percolation cluster
- Directed percolation
- Bootstrap percolation
- Biological lattice-gas cellular automaton
