= Percolation threshold =

Threshold of percolation theory models

The percolation threshold is a mathematical concept in percolation theory that describes the formation of long-range connectivity in random systems. Below the threshold a giant connected component does not exist; while above it, there exists a giant component of the order of system size. In engineering and coffee making, percolation represents the flow of fluids through porous media, but in the mathematics and physics worlds it generally refers to simplified lattice models of random systems or networks (graphs), and the nature of the connectivity in them. The percolation threshold is the critical value of the occupation probability p, or more generally a critical surface for a group of parameters p_{1}, p_{2}, ..., such that infinite connectivity (percolation) first occurs.

== Percolation models ==
The most common percolation model is to take a regular lattice, like a square lattice, and make it into a random network by randomly "occupying" sites (vertices) or bonds (edges) with a statistically independent probability p. At a critical threshold p_{c}, large clusters and long-range connectivity first appear, and this is called the percolation threshold. Depending on the method for obtaining the random network, one distinguishes between the site percolation threshold and the bond percolation threshold. More general systems have several probabilities p_{1}, p_{2}, etc., and the transition is characterized by a critical surface or manifold. One can also consider continuum systems, such as overlapping disks and spheres placed randomly, or the negative space (Swiss-cheese models).

To understand the threshold, you can consider a quantity such as the probability that there is a continuous path from one boundary to another along occupied sites or bonds—that is, within a single cluster. For example, one can consider a square system where each edge allows passage with probability p, and ask for the probability P that there is a path from the top boundary to the bottom boundary. As a function of p, one finds a sigmoidal plot that goes from P=0 at p=0 to P=1 at p=1. The larger the square is compared to the lattice spacing, the sharper the transition will be. When the system size goes to infinity, P(p) will be a step function at the threshold value p_{c}. For finite large systems, P(p_{c}) is a constant whose value depends upon the shape of the system; for the square system discussed above, P(p_{c})=1/2 exactly for any lattice by a symmetry argument, using the self-duality of the square lattice.

There are other signatures of the critical threshold. For example, the size distribution (number of clusters of size s) drops off as a power-law for large s at the threshold, n_{s}(p_{c}) ~ s^{−τ}, where τ is one of the dimension-dependent percolation critical exponents. For an infinite system, the critical threshold corresponds to the first point (as p increases) where the size of the clusters becomes infinite.

In the systems described so far, it has been assumed that the occupation of a site or bond is completely random—this is the so-called Bernoulli percolation. For a continuum system, random occupancy corresponds to the points being placed by a Poisson process. Further variations involve correlated percolation, such as percolation clusters related to Ising and Potts models of ferromagnets, in which the bonds are put down by the Fortuin–Kasteleyn method. In bootstrap or k-sat percolation, sites and/or bonds are first occupied and then successively culled from a system if a site does not have at least k neighbors. Another important model of percolation, in a different universality class altogether, is directed percolation, where connectivity along a bond depends upon the direction of the flow. Another variation of recent interest is explosive percolation, whose thresholds are listed on that page.

Over the last several decades, a tremendous amount of work has gone into finding exact and approximate values of the percolation thresholds for a variety of these systems. Exact thresholds are only known for certain two-dimensional lattices that can be broken up into a self-dual array, such that under a triangle-triangle transformation, the system remains the same. Studies using numerical methods have led to numerous improvements in algorithms and several theoretical discoveries.

Simple duality in two dimensions implies that all fully triangulated lattices (e.g., the triangular, union jack, cross dual, martini dual and asanoha or 3-12 dual, and the Delaunay triangulation) all have site thresholds of 1/2, and self-dual lattices (square, martini-B) have bond thresholds of 1/2.

The notation such as (4,8^{2}) comes from Grünbaum and Shephard, and indicates that around a given vertex, going in the clockwise direction, one encounters first a square and then two octagons. Besides the eleven Archimedean lattices composed of regular polygons with every site equivalent, many other more complicated lattices with sites of different classes have been studied.

Error bars in the last digit or digits are shown by numbers in parentheses. Thus, 0.729724(3) signifies 0.729724 ± 0.000003, and 0.74042195(80) signifies 0.74042195 ± 0.00000080. The error bars variously represent one or two standard deviations in net error (including statistical and expected systematic error), or an empirical confidence interval, depending upon the source.

== Percolation on networks ==
For a random tree-like network (i.e., a connected network with no cycle) without degree-degree correlation, it can be shown that such network can have a giant component, and the percolation threshold (transmission probability) is given by

$p_c = \frac{1}{g_1'(1)} = \frac{\langle k \rangle}{\langle k^2 \rangle - \langle k \rangle}$.

Where $g_1(z)$ is the generating function corresponding to the excess degree distribution, ${\langle k \rangle}$ is the average degree of the network and ${\langle k^2 \rangle}$ is the second moment of the degree distribution. So, for example, for an ER network, since the degree distribution is a Poisson distribution, where${\langle k^2 \rangle = \langle k \rangle^2 + \langle k \rangle},$ the threshold is at $p_c = {\langle k \rangle}^{-1}$.

In networks with low clustering, $0 < C \ll 1$, the critical point gets scaled by $(1-C)^{-1}$ such that:

$p_c = \frac{1}{1-C}\frac{1}{g_1'(1)}.$

This indicates that for a given degree distribution, the clustering leads to a larger percolation threshold, mainly because for a fixed number of links, the clustering structure reinforces the core of the network with the price of diluting the global connections. For networks with high clustering, strong clustering could induce the core–periphery structure, in which the core and periphery might percolate at different critical points, and the above approximate treatment is not applicable.

== Percolation in 2D ==
=== Thresholds on Archimedean lattices ===
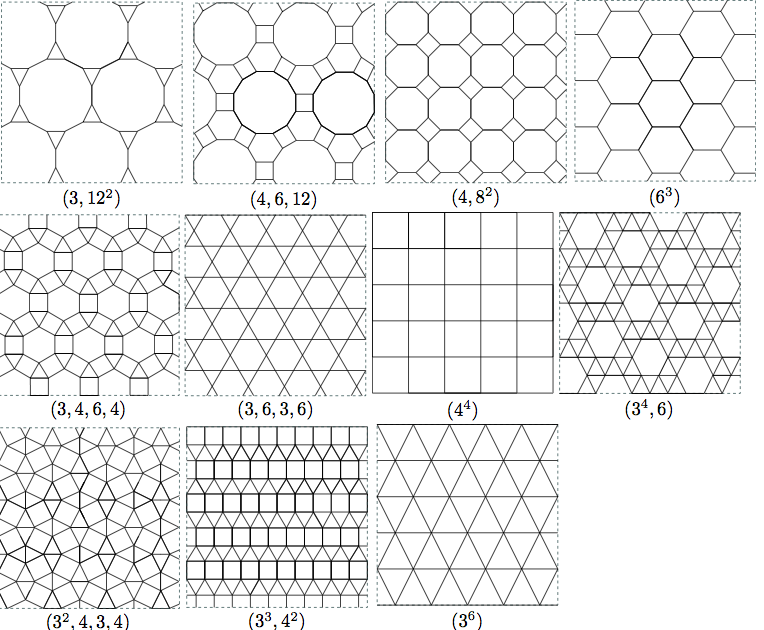
This is a picture of the 11 Archimedean Lattices or Uniform tilings, in which all polygons are regular and each vertex is surrounded by the same sequence of polygons. The notation "(3^{4}, 6)", for example, means that every vertex is surrounded by four triangles and one hexagon. Some common names that have been given to these lattices are listed in the table below.

Lattice	z	$\overline z$	Site percolation threshold	Bond percolation threshold
3-12 or super-kagome, (3, 12^{2} )	3	3	0.807900764... = (1 − 2 sin (π/18))^{1/2}	0.74042195(80), 0.74042077(2), 0.740420800(2), 0.7404207988509(8), 0.740420798850811610(2),
cross, truncated trihexagonal (4, 6, 12)	3	3	0.746, 0.750, 0.747806(4), 0.7478008(2)	0.6937314(1), 0.69373383(72), 0.693733124922(2)
square octagon, bathroom tile, 4-8, truncated square (4, 8^{2})	3	-	0.729, 0.729724(3), 0.7297232(5)	0.6768, 0.67680232(63), 0.6768031269(6), 0.6768031243900113(3),
honeycomb (6^{3})	3	3	0.6962(6), 0.697040230(5), 0.6970402(1), 0.6970413(10), 0.697043(3),	0.652703645... = 1-2 sin (π/18), 1+ p^{3}-3p^{2}=0
kagome (3, 6, 3, 6)	4	4	0.652703645... = 1 − 2 sin(π/18)	0.5244053(3), 0.52440516(10), 0.52440499(2), 0.524404978(5), 0.52440572..., 0.52440500(1), 0.524404999173(3), 0.524404999167439(4) 0.52440499916744820(1)
ruby, rhombitrihexagonal (3, 4, 6, 4)	4	4	0.620, 0.621819(3), 0.62181207(7)	0.52483258(53), 0.5248311(1), 0.524831461573(1)
square (4^{4})	4	4	0.59274(10), 0.59274605079210(2), 0.59274601(2), 0.59274605095(15), 0.59274621(13), 0.592746050786(3), 0.5927460507896(1), 0.59274605079016(1), 0.59274621(33), 0.59274598(4), 0.59274605(3), 0.593(1), 0.591(1), 0.569(13), 0.59274(5)	1/2
snub hexagonal, maple leaf (3^{4},6)	5	5	0.579 0.579498(3)	0.43430621(50), 0.43432764(3), 0.4343283172240(6),
snub square, puzzle, Shastry-Sutherland (3^{2}, 4, 3, 4 )	5	5	0.550, 0.550806(3)	0.41413743(46), 0.4141378476(7), 0.4141378565917(1),
frieze, trellis, elongated triangular(3^{3}, 4^{2})	5	5	0.549, 0.550213(3), 0.5502(8)	0.4196(6), 0.41964191(43), 0.41964044(1), 0.41964035886369(2)
triangular (3^{6})	6	6	1/2	0.347296355... = 2 sin (π/18), 1 + p^{3} − 3p = 0

Note: sometimes "hexagonal" is used in place of honeycomb, although in some contexts a triangular lattice is also called a hexagonal lattice. z = bulk coordination number.

=== 2D lattices with extended and complex neighborhoods ===
In this section, sq-1,2,3 corresponds to square (NN+2NN+3NN), etc. Equivalent to square-2N+3N+4N, sq(1,2,3). tri = triangular, hc = honeycomb.

Lattice	z	Site percolation threshold	Bond percolation threshold
sq-1, sq-2, sq-3, sq-5	4	0.5927... (square site)	
sq-1,2, sq-2,3, sq-3,5... 3x3 square	8	0.407... (square matching)	0.25036834(6), 0.2503685, 0.25036840(4)
sq-1,3	8	0.337	0.2214995
sq-2,5: 2NN+5NN	8	0.337	
hc-1,2,3: honeycomb-NN+2NN+3NN	12	0.300, 0.300, 0.302960... = 1-p_{c}(site, hc)	
tri-1,2: triangular-NN+2NN	12	0.295, 0.289, 0.290258(19)	
tri-2,3: triangular-2NN+3NN	12	0.232020(36), 0.232020(20)	
sq-4: square-4NN	8	0.270...	
sq-1,5: square-NN+5NN (r ≤ 2)	8	0.277	
sq-1,2,3: square-NN+2NN+3NN	12	0.292, 0.290(5) 0.289, 0.288, 0.2891226(14)	0.1522203
sq-2,3,5: square-2NN+3NN+5NN	12	0.288	
sq-1,4: square-NN+4NN	12	0.236	
sq-2,4: square-2NN+4NN	12	0.225	
tri-4: triangular-4NN	12	0.192450(36), 0.1924428(50)	
hc-2,4: honeycomb-2NN+4NN	12	0.2374	
tri-1,3: triangular-NN+3NN	12	0.264539(21)	
tri-1,2,3: triangular-NN+2NN+3NN	18	0.225, 0.215, 0.215459(36) 0.2154657(17)	
sq-3,4: 3NN+4NN	12	0.221	
sq-1,2,5: NN+2NN+5NN	12	0.240	0.13805374
sq-1,3,5: NN+3NN+5NN	12	0.233	
sq-4,5: 4NN+5NN	12	0.199	
sq-1,2,4: NN+2NN+4NN	16	0.219	
sq-1,3,4: NN+3NN+4NN	16	0.208	
sq-2,3,4: 2NN+3NN+4NN	16	0.202	
sq-1,4,5: NN+4NN+5NN	16	0.187	
sq-2,4,5: 2NN+4NN+5NN	16	0.182	
sq-3,4,5: 3NN+4NN+5NN	16	0.179	
sq-1,2,3,5 asterisk pattern	16	0.208	0.1032177
tri-4,5: 4NN+5NN	18	0.140250(36),	
sq-1,2,3,4: NN+2NN+3NN+4NN ($r \le \sqrt{5}$)	20	0.19671(9), 0.196, 0.196724(10), 0.1967293(7)	0.0841509
sq-1,2,4,5: NN+2NN+4NN+5NN	20	0.177	
sq-1,3,4,5: NN+3NN+4NN+5NN	20	0.172	
sq-2,3,4,5: 2NN+3NN+4NN+5NN	20	0.167	
sq-1,2,3,5,6 asterisk pattern	20		0.0783110
sq-1,2,3,4,5: NN+2NN+3NN+4NN+5NN ($r \le \sqrt{8}$, also within a 5 × 5 square)	24	0.164, 0.164, 0.1647124(6)	
sq-1,2,3,4,6: NN+2NN+3NN+4NN+6NN (diamond $r \le 3$)	24	0.16134,	
tri-1,4,5: NN+4NN+5NN	24	0.131660(36)	
sq-1,...,6: NN+...+6NN (r≤3)	28	0.142, 0.1432551(9)	0.0558493
tri-2,3,4,5: 2NN+3NN+4NN+5NN	30	0.117460(36) 0.135823(27)	
tri-1,2,3,4,5: NN+2NN+3NN+4NN+5NN	36	0.115, 0.115740(36), 0.1157399(58)	
sq-1,...,7: NN+...+7NN ($r \le \sqrt{10}$)	36	0.113, 0.1153481(9)	0.04169608
sq lat, diamond boundary: dist. ≤ 4	40	0.105(5)	
sq-1,...,8: NN+..+8NN ($r \le \sqrt{13}$)	44	0.095, 0.095765(5), 0.09580(2), 0.0957661(9)	
sq-1,...,9: NN+..+9NN (r≤4)	48	0.086	0.02974268
sq-1,...,11: NN+...+11NN ($r \le \sqrt{18}$)	60		0.02301190(3)
sq-1,...,23 (r ≤ 7)	148		0.008342595
sq-1,...,32: NN+...+32NN ($r \le \sqrt{72}$)	224		0.0053050415(33)
sq-1,...,86: NN+...+86NN (r≤15)	708		0.001557644(4)
sq-1,...,141: NN+...+141NN ($r \le \sqrt{389}$)	1224		0.000880188(90)
sq-1,...,185: NN+...+185NN (r≤23)	1652		0.000645458(4)
sq-1,...,317: NN+...+317NN (r≤31)	3000		0.000349601(3)
sq-1,...,413: NN+...+413NN ($r \le \sqrt{1280}$)	4016		0.0002594722(11)
sq lat, diamond boundary: dist. ≤ 6	84	0.049(5)	
sq lat, diamond boundary: dist. ≤ 8	144	0.028(5)	
sq lat, diamond boundary: dist. ≤ 10	220	0.019(5)	
2x2 touching lattice squares* (same as sq-1,2,3,4)	20	φ_{c} = 0.58365(2), p_{c} = 0.196724(10), 0.19671(9),	
3x3 touching lattice squares* (same as sq-1,...,8))	44	φ_{c} = 0.59586(2), p_{c} = 0.095765(5), 0.09580(2)	
4x4 touching lattice squares*	76	φ_{c} = 0.60648(1), p_{c} = 0.0566227(15), 0.05665(3),	
5x5 touching lattice squares*	116	φ_{c} = 0.61467(2), p_{c} = 0.037428(2), 0.03745(2),	
6x6 touching lattice squares*	220	p_{c} = 0.02663(1),	
10x10 touching lattice squares*	436	φ_{c} = 0.63609(2), p_{c} = 0.0100576(5)	
within 11 × 11 square (r=5)	120		0.01048079(6)
within 15 × 15 square (r=7)	224		0.005287692(22)
20x20 touching lattice squares*	1676	φ_{c} = 0.65006(2), p_{c} = 0.0026215(3)	
within 31 × 31 square (r=15)	960		0.001131082(5)
100x100 touching lattice squares*	40396	φ_{c} = 0.66318(2), p_{c} = 0.000108815(12)	
1000x1000 touching lattice squares*	4003996	φ_{c} = 0.66639(1), p_{c} = 1.09778(6)E-06	

Here NN = nearest neighbor, 2NN = second nearest neighbor (or next nearest neighbor), 3NN = third nearest neighbor (or next-next nearest neighbor), etc. These are also called 2N, 3N, 4N respectively in some papers.

- For overlapping or touching squares, $p_c$(site) given here is the net fraction of sites occupied $\phi_c$ similar to the $\phi_c$ in continuum percolation. The case of a 2×2 square is equivalent to percolation of a square lattice NN+2NN+3NN+4NN or sq-1,2,3,4 with threshold $1-(1-\phi_c)^{1/4} = 0.196724(10)\ldots$ with $\phi_c= 0.58365(2)$. The 3×3 square corresponds to sq-1,2,3,4,5,6,7,8 with z=44 and $p_c=1-(1-\phi_c)^{1/9} = 0.095765(5)\ldots$. The value of z for a k × k square is (2k+1)^{2}-5.

=== 2D distorted lattices ===
Here, one distorts a regular lattice of unit spacing by moving vertices uniformly within the box $(x-\alpha,x+\alpha),(y-\alpha,y+\alpha)$, and considers percolation when sites are within Euclidean distance $d$ of each other.

Lattice	$\overline z$	$\alpha$	$d$	Site percolation threshold	Bond percolation threshold
square		0.2	1.1	0.8025(2)	
		0.2	1.2	0.6667(5)	
		0.1	1.1	0.6619(1)	

=== Overlapping shapes on 2D lattices ===
Site threshold is number of overlapping objects per lattice site. k is the length (net area). Overlapping squares are shown in the complex neighborhood section. Here z is the coordination number to k-mers of either orientation, with $z = k^2+10k-2$ for $1 \times k$ sticks.

System	k	z	Site coverage φ_{c}	Site percolation threshold p_{c}
1 × 2 dimer, square lattice	2	22	0.54691 0.5483(2)	0.17956(3) 0.18019(9)
1 × 2 aligned dimer, square lattice	2	14(?)	0.5715(18)	0.3454(13)
1 × 3 trimer, square lattice	3	37	0.49898 0.50004(64)	0.10880(2) 0.1093(2)
1 × 4 stick, square lattice	4	54	0.45761	0.07362(2)
1 × 5 stick, square lattice	5	73	0.42241	0.05341(1)
1 × 6 stick, square lattice	6	94	0.39219	0.04063(2)

The coverage is calculated from $p_c$ by $\phi_c = 1-(1-p_c)^{2 k}$ for $1 \times k$ sticks, because there are $2k$ sites where a stick will cause an overlap with a given site.

For aligned $1 \times k$ sticks: $\phi_c = 1-(1-p_c)^{k}$

=== Approximate formulas for thresholds of Archimedean lattices ===
Lattice	z	Site percolation threshold	Bond percolation threshold
(3, 12^{2} )	3		
(4, 6, 12)	3		
(4, 8^{2})	3		0.676835..., 4p^{3} + 3p^{4} − 6 p^{5} − 2 p^{6} = 1
honeycomb (6^{3})	3		
kagome (3, 6, 3, 6)	4		0.524430..., 3p^{2} + 6p^{3} − 12 p^{4}+ 6 p^{5} − p^{6} = 1
(3, 4, 6, 4)	4		
square (4^{4})	4		1/2 (exact)
(3^{4},6 )	5		0.434371..., 12p^{3} + 36p^{4} − 21p^{5} − 327 p^{6} + 69p^{7} + 2532p^{8} − 6533 p^{9} + 8256 p^{10} − 6255p^{11} + 2951p^{12} − 837 p^{13} + 126 p^{14} − 7p^{15} = 1
snub square, puzzle (3^{2}, 4, 3, 4 )	5		
(3^{3}, 4^{2})	5		
triangular (3^{6})	6	1/2 (exact)	

=== AB percolation and colored percolation in 2D ===
In AB percolation, a $p_\mathrm{site}$ is the proportion of A sites among B sites, and bonds are drawn between sites of opposite species. It is also called antipercolation.

In colored percolation, occupied sites are assigned one of $n$ colors with equal probability, and connection is made along bonds between neighbors of different colors.

Lattice	z	$\overline z$	Site percolation threshold
triangular AB	6	6	0.2145, 0.21524(34), 0.21564(3)
AB on square-covering lattice	6	6	$1-\sqrt{1-p_c(site,sq)} = 0.361835$
square three-color	4	4	0.80745(5)
square four-color	4	4	0.73415(4)
square five-color	4	4	0.69864(7)
square six-color	4	4	0.67751(5)
triangular two-color	6	6	0.72890(4)
triangular three-color	6	6	0.63005(4)
triangular four-color	6	6	0.59092(3)
triangular five-color	6	6	0.56991(5)
triangular six-color	6	6	0.55679(5)

=== Site-bond percolation in 2D ===
Site bond percolation. Here $p_s$ is the site occupation probability and $p_b$ is the bond occupation probability, and connectivity is made only if both the sites and bonds along a path are occupied. The criticality condition becomes a curve $f(p_{s},p_{b})$ = 0, and some specific critical pairs $(p_{s},p_{b})$ are listed below.

Square lattice:

Lattice	z	$\overline z$	Site percolation threshold	Bond percolation threshold
square	4	4	0.615185(15)	0.95
			0.667280(15)	0.85
			0.732100(15)	0.75
			0.75	0.726195(15)
			0.815560(15)	0.65
			0.85	0.615810(30)
			0.95	0.533620(15)

Honeycomb (hexagonal) lattice:

Lattice	z	$\overline z$	Site percolation threshold	Bond percolation threshold
honeycomb	3	3	0.7275(5)	0.95
			0. 0.7610(5)	0.90
			0.7986(5)	0.85
			0.80	0.8481(5)
			0.8401(5)	0.80
			0.85	0.7890(5)
			0.90	0.7377(5)
			0.95	0.6926(5)

Kagome lattice:

Lattice	z	$\overline z$	Site percolation threshold	Bond percolation threshold
kagome	4	4	0.6711(4), 0.67097(3)	0.95
			0.6914(5), 0.69210(2)	0.90
			0.7162(5), 0.71626(3)	0.85
			0.7428(5), 0.74339(3)	0.80
			0.75	0.7894(9)
			0.7757(8), 0.77556(3)	0.75
			0.80	0.7152(7)
			0.81206(3)	0.70
			0.85	0.6556(6)
			0.85519(3)	0.65
			0.90	0.6046(5)
			0.90546(3)	0.60
			0.95	0.5615(4)
			0.96604(4)	0.55
			0.9854(3)	0.53

* For values on different lattices, see "An investigation of site-bond percolation on many lattices".

Approximate formula for site-bond percolation on a honeycomb lattice

Lattice	z	$\overline z$	Threshold	Notes
(6^{3}) honeycomb	3	3	$p_b p_s [1 - (\sqrt{p_{bc}}/(3-p_{bc}))(\sqrt{p_b} - \sqrt{p_{bc}})] = p_{bc}$, When equal: p_{s} = p_{b} = 0.82199	approximate formula, p_{s} = site prob., p_{b} = bond prob., p_{bc} = 1 − 2 sin (π/18), exact at p_{s}=1, p_{b}=p_{bc}.

=== Archimedean duals (Laves lattices) ===
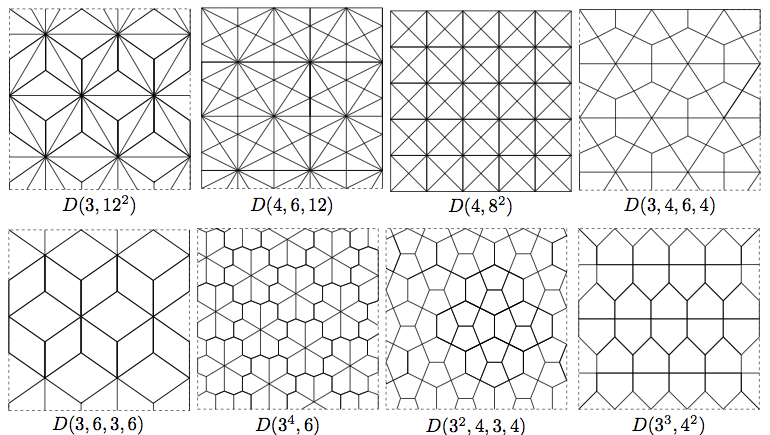
Example image caption

Laves lattices are the duals to the Archimedean lattices. Drawings from. See also Uniform tilings.

Lattice	z	$\overline z$	Site percolation threshold	Bond percolation threshold
Cairo pentagonal D(3^{2},4,3,4)=(2/3)(5^{3})+(1/3)(5^{4})	3,4	3 1/3	0.6501834(2), 0.650184(5)	0.585863... = 1 − p_{c}^{bond}(3^{2},4,3,4)
Pentagonal D(3^{3},4^{2})=(1/3)(5^{4})+(2/3)(5^{3})	3,4	3 1/3	0.6470471(2), 0.647084(5), 0.6471(6)	0.580358... = 1 − p_{c}^{bond}(3^{3},4^{2}), 0.5800(6)
D(3^{4},6)=(1/5)(4^{6})+(4/5)(4^{3})	3,6	3 3/5	0.639447	0.565694... = 1 − p_{c}^{bond}(3^{4},6 )
dice, rhombille tiling D(3,6,3,6) = (1/3)(4^{6}) + (2/3)(4^{3})	3,6	4	0.5851(4), 0.585040(5)	0.475595... = 1 − p_{c}^{bond}(3,6,3,6 )
ruby dual D(3,4,6,4) = (1/6)(4^{6}) + (2/6)(4^{3}) + (3/6)(4^{4})	3,4,6	4	0.582410(5)	0.475167... = 1 − p_{c}^{bond}(3,4,6,4 )
union jack, tetrakis square tiling D(4,8^{2}) = (1/2)(3^{4}) + (1/2)(3^{8})	4,8	6	1/2	0.323197... = 1 − p_{c}^{bond}(4,8^{2} )
bisected hexagon, cross dual D(4,6,12)= (1/6)(3^{12})+(2/6)(3^{6})+(1/2)(3^{4})	4,6,12	6	1/2	0.306266... = 1 − p_{c}^{bond}(4,6,12)
asanoha (hemp leaf) D(3, 12^{2})=(2/3)(3^{3})+(1/3)(3^{12})	3,12	6	1/2	0.259579... = 1 − p_{c}^{bond}(3, 12^{2})

=== 2-uniform lattices ===
Top 3 lattices: #13 #12 #36
Bottom 3 lattices: #34 #37 #11

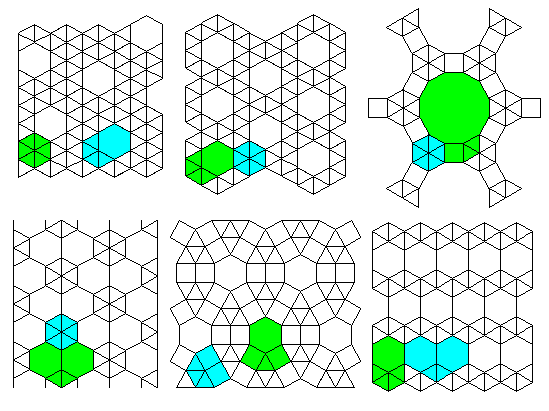
20 2 uniform lattices

Top 2 lattices: #35 #30
Bottom 2 lattices: #41 #42

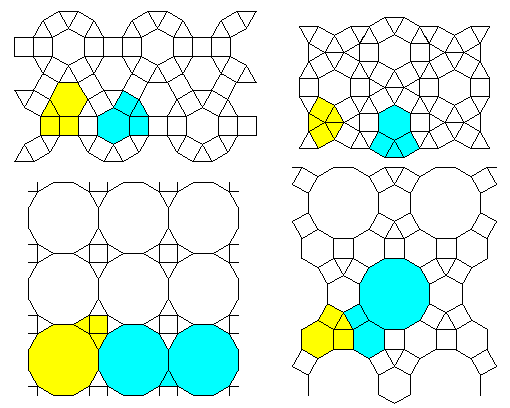
20 2 uniform lattices

Top 4 lattices: #22 #23 #21 #20
Bottom 3 lattices: #16 #17 #15

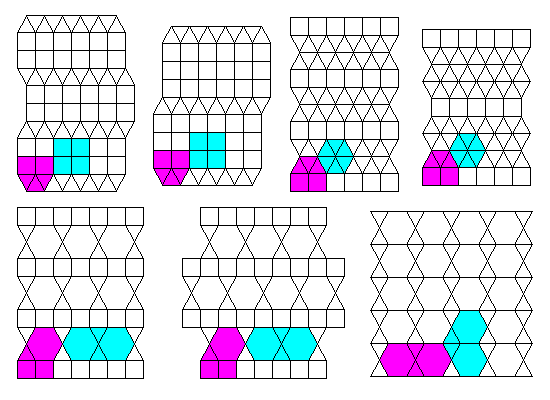
20 2 uniform lattices

Top 2 lattices: #31 #32
Bottom lattice: #33

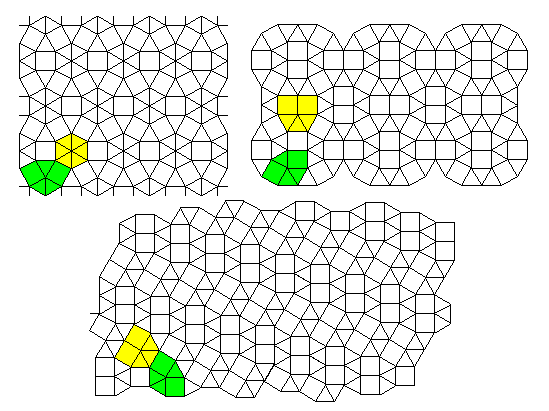
20 2 uniform lattices

#	Lattice	z	$\overline z$	Site percolation threshold	Bond percolation threshold
41	(1/2)(3,4,3,12) + (1/2)(3, 12^{2})	4,3	3.5	0.7680(2)	0.67493252(36)*
42	(1/3)(3,4,6,4) + (2/3)(4,6,12)	4,3	3 1/3	0.7157(2)	0.64536587(40)*
36	(1/7)(3^{6}) + (6/7)(3^{2},4,12)	6,4	4 2/7	0.6808(2)	0.55778329(40)*
15	(2/3)(3^{2},6^{2}) + (1/3)(3,6,3,6)	4,4	4	0.6499(2)	0.53632487(40)*
34	(1/7)(3^{6}) + (6/7)(3^{2},6^{2})	6,4	4 2/7	0.6329(2)	0.51707873(70)*
16	(4/5)(3,4^{2},6) + (1/5)(3,6,3,6)	4,4	4	0.6286(2)	0.51891529(35)*
17	(4/5)(3,4^{2},6) + (1/5)(3,6,3,6)*	4,4	4	0.6279(2)	0.51769462(35)*
35	(2/3)(3,4^{2},6) + (1/3)(3,4,6,4)	4,4	4	0.6221(2)	0.51973831(40)*
11	(1/2)(3^{4},6) + (1/2)(3^{2},6^{2})	5,4	4.5	0.6171(2)	0.48921280(37)*
37	(1/2)(3^{3},4^{2}) + (1/2)(3,4,6,4)	5,4	4.5	0.5885(2)	0.47229486(38)*
30	(1/2)(3^{2},4,3,4) + (1/2)(3,4,6,4)	5,4	4.5	0.5883(2)	0.46573078(72)*
23	(1/2)(3^{3},4^{2}) + (1/2)(4^{4})	5,4	4.5	0.5720(2)	0.45844622(40)*
22	(2/3)(3^{3},4^{2}) + (1/3)(4^{4})	5,4	4 2/3	0.5648(2)	0.44528611(40)*
12	(1/4)(3^{6}) + (3/4)(3^{4},6)	6,5	5 1/4	0.5607(2)	0.41109890(37)*
33	(1/2)(3^{3},4^{2}) + (1/2)(3^{2},4,3,4)	5,5	5	0.5505(2)	0.41628021(35)*
32	(1/3)(3^{3},4^{2}) + (2/3)(3^{2},4,3,4)	5,5	5	0.5504(2)	0.41549285(36)*
31	(1/7)(3^{6}) + (6/7)(3^{2},4,3,4)	6,5	5 1/7	0.5440(2)	0.40379585(40)*
13	(1/2)(3^{6}) + (1/2)(3^{4},6)	6,5	5.5	0.5407(2)	0.38914898(35)*
21	(1/3)(3^{6}) + (2/3)(3^{3},4^{2})	6,5	5 1/3	0.5342(2)	0.39491996(40)*
20	(1/2)(3^{6}) + (1/2)(3^{3},4^{2})	6,5	5.5	0.5258(2)	0.38285085(38)*

- Hang Gu and Robert Ziff, 2009

=== Inhomogeneous 2-uniform lattice ===
2-uniform lattice #37

This figure shows something similar to the 2-uniform lattice #37, except the polygons are not all regular—there is a rectangle in the place of the two squares—and the size of the polygons is changed. This lattice is in the isoradial representation in which each polygon is inscribed in a circle of unit radius. The two squares in the 2-uniform lattice must now be represented as a single rectangle in order to satisfy the isoradial condition. The lattice is shown by black edges, and the dual lattice by red dashed lines. The green circles show the isoradial constraint on both the original and dual lattices. The yellow polygons highlight the three types of polygons on the lattice, and the pink polygons highlight the two types of polygons on the dual lattice. The lattice has vertex types (1/2)(3^{3},4^{2}) + (1/2)(3,4,6,4), while the dual lattice has vertex types (1/15)(4^{6})+(6/15)(4^{2},5^{2})+(2/15)(5^{3})+(6/15)(5^{2},4). The critical point is where the longer bonds (on both the lattice and dual lattice) have occupation probability p = 2 sin (π/18) = 0.347296... which is the bond percolation threshold on a triangular lattice, and the shorter bonds have occupation probability 1 − 2 sin(π/18) = 0.652703..., which is the bond percolation on a hexagonal lattice. These results follow from the isoradial condition but also follow from applying the star-triangle transformation to certain stars on the honeycomb lattice. Finally, it can be generalized to having three different probabilities in the three different directions, p_{1}, p_{2} and p_{3} for the long bonds, and 1 − p_{1}, 1 − p_{2}, and 1 − p_{3} for the short bonds, where p_{1}, p_{2} and p_{3} satisfy the critical surface for the inhomogeneous triangular lattice.

=== Thresholds on 2D bow-tie and martini lattices ===
To the left, center, and right are: the martini lattice, the martini-A lattice, the martini-B lattice. Below: the martini covering/medial lattice, same as the 2×2, 1×1 subnet for kagome-type lattices (removed).

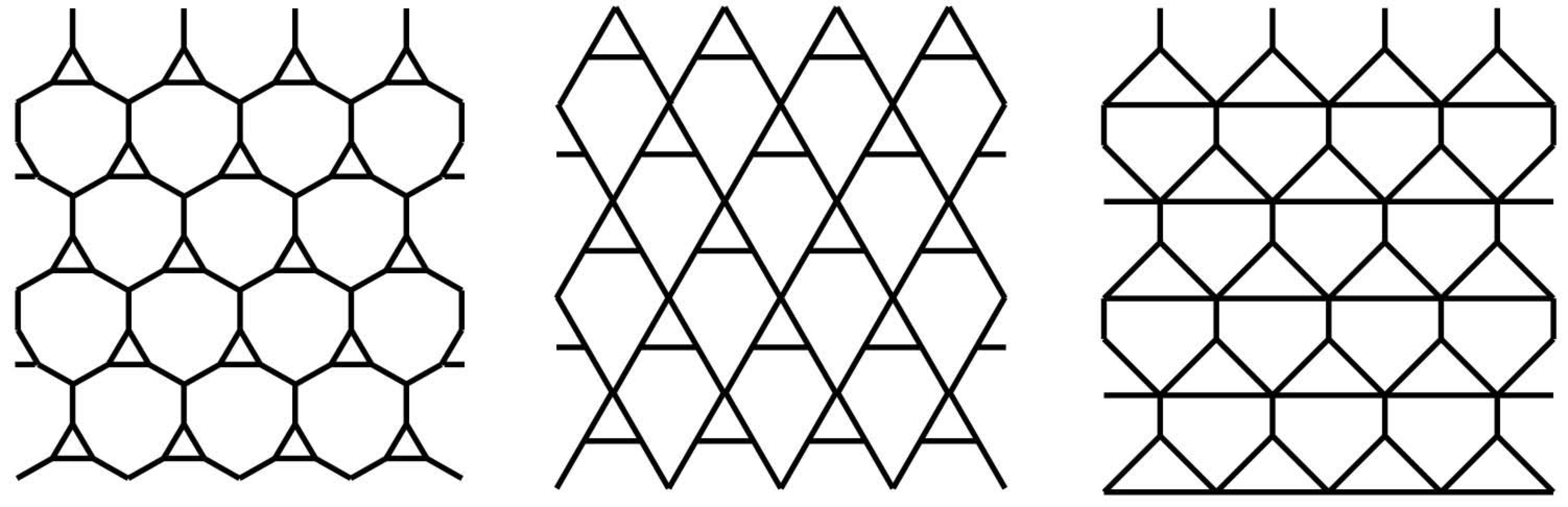
Example image caption

Some other examples of generalized bow-tie lattices (a-d) and the duals of the lattices (e-h):

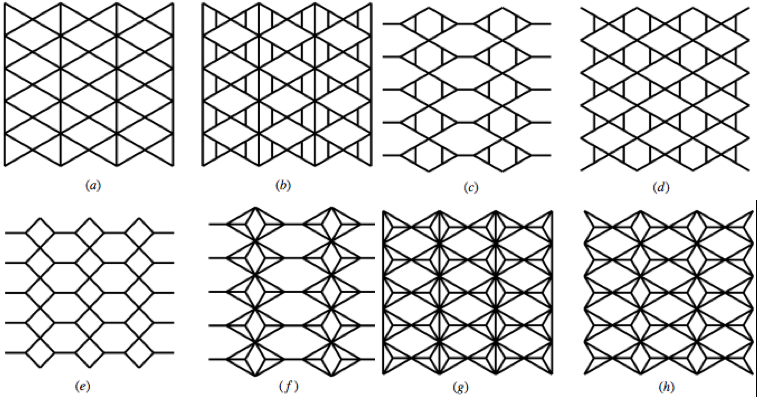
Example image caption

Lattice	z	$\overline z$	Site percolation threshold	Bond percolation threshold
martini (3/4)(3,9^{2})+(1/4)(9^{3})	3	3	0.764826..., 1 + p^{4} − 3p^{3} = 0	0.707107... = 1/√2
bow-tie (c)	3,4	3 1/7		0.672929..., 1 − 2p^{3} − 2p^{4} − 2p^{5} − 7p^{6} + 18p^{7} + 11p^{8} − 35p^{9} + 21p^{10} − 4p^{11} = 0
bow-tie (d)	3,4	3 1/3		0.625457..., 1 − 2p^{2} − 3p^{3} + 4p^{4} − p^{5} = 0
martini-A (2/3)(3,7^{2})+(1/3)(3,7^{3})	3,4	3 1/3	1/√2	0.625457..., 1 − 2p^{2} − 3p^{3} + 4p^{4} − p^{5} = 0
bow-tie dual (e)	3,4	3 2/3		0.595482..., 1-p_{c}^{bond} (bow-tie (a))
bow-tie (b)	3,4,6	3 2/3		0.533213..., 1 − p − 2p^{3} -4p^{4}-4p^{5}+15p^{6}+ 13p^{7}-36p^{8}+19p^{9}+ p^{10} + p^{11}=0
martini covering/medial (1/2)(3^{3},9) + (1/2)(3,9,3,9)	4	4	0.707107... = 1/√2	0.57086651(33)
martini-B (1/2)(3,5,3,5^{2}) + (1/2)(3,5^{2})	3, 5	4	0.618034... = 2/(1 + √5), 1- p^{2} − p = 0	1/2
bow-tie dual (f)	3,4,8	4 2/5		0.466787..., 1 − p_{c}^{bond} (bow-tie (b))
bow-tie (a) (1/2)(3^{2},4,3^{2},4) + (1/2)(3,4,3)	4,6	5	0.5472(2), 0.5479148(7)	0.404518..., 1 − p − 6p^{2} + 6p^{3} − p^{5} = 0
bow-tie dual (h)	3,6,8	5		0.374543..., 1 − p_{c}^{bond}(bow-tie (d))
bow-tie dual (g)	3,6,10	5 1/2	0.547... = p_{c}^{site}(bow-tie(a))	0.327071..., 1 − p_{c}^{bond}(bow-tie (c))
martini dual (1/2)(3^{3}) + (1/2)(3^{9})	3,9	6	1/2	0.292893... = 1 − 1/√2

=== Thresholds on 2D covering, medial, and matching lattices ===
Lattice	z	$\overline z$	Site percolation threshold	Bond percolation threshold
(4, 6, 12) covering/medial	4	4	p_{c}^{bond}(4, 6, 12) = 0.693731...	0.5593140(2), 0.559315(1)
(4, 8^{2}) covering/medial, square kagome	4	4	p_{c}^{bond}(4,8^{2}) = 0.676803...	0.544798017(4), 0.54479793(34)
(3^{4}, 6) medial	4	4		0.5247495(5)
(3,4,6,4) medial	4	4		0.51276
(3^{2}, 4, 3, 4) medial	4	4		0.512682929(8)
(3^{3}, 4^{2}) medial	4	4		0.5125245984(9)
square covering (non-planar)	6	6	1/2	0.3371(1)
square matching lattice (non-planar)	8	8	1 − p_{c}^{site}(square) = 0.407253...	0.25036834(6)

(4, 6, 12) covering/medial lattice

(4, 8^{2}) covering/medial lattice

(3,12^{2}) covering/medial lattice (in light grey), equivalent to the kagome (2 × 2) subnet, and in black, the dual of these lattices.

(3,4,6,4) covering/medial lattice, equivalent to the 2-uniform lattice #30, but with facing triangles made into a diamond. This pattern appears in Iranian tilework. such as Western tomb tower, Kharraqan.

(3,4,6,4) medial dual, shown in red, with medial lattice in light gray behind it

=== Thresholds on 2D chimera non-planar lattices ===
Lattice	z	$\overline z$	Site percolation threshold	Bond percolation threshold
K(2,2)	4	4	0.51253(14)	0.44778(15)
K(3,3)	6	6	0.43760(15)	0.35502(15)
K(4,4)	8	8	0.38675(7)	0.29427(12)
K(5,5)	10	10	0.35115(13)	0.25159(13)
K(6,6)	12	12	0.32232(13)	0.21942(11)
K(7,7)	14	14	0.30052(14)	0.19475(9)
K(8,8)	16	16	0.28103(11)	0.17496(10)

=== Thresholds on subnet lattices ===
Example image caption

The 2 × 2, 3 × 3, and 4 × 4 subnet kagome lattices. The 2 × 2 subnet is also known as the "triangular kagome" lattice.

Lattice	z	$\overline z$	Site percolation threshold	Bond percolation threshold
checkerboard – 2 × 2 subnet	4,3			0.596303(1)
checkerboard – 4 × 4 subnet	4,3			0.633685(9)
checkerboard – 8 × 8 subnet	4,3			0.642318(5)
checkerboard – 16 × 16 subnet	4,3			0.64237(1)
checkerboard – 32 × 32 subnet	4,3			0.64219(2)
checkerboard – $\infty$ subnet	4,3			0.642216(10)
kagome – 2 × 2 subnet = (3, 12^{2}) covering/medial	4		p_{c}^{bond} (3, 12^{2}) = 0.74042077...	0.600861966960(2), 0.6008624(10), 0.60086193(3)
kagome – 3 × 3 subnet	4			0.6193296(10), 0.61933176(5), 0.61933044(32)
kagome – 4 × 4 subnet	4			0.625365(3), 0.62536424(7)
kagome – $\infty$ subnet	4			0.628961(2)
kagome – (1 × 1):(2 × 2) subnet = martini covering/medial	4		p_{c}^{bond}(martini) = 1/√2 = 0.707107...	0.57086648(36)
kagome – (1 × 1):(3 × 3) subnet	4,3		0.728355596425196...	0.58609776(37)
kagome – (1 × 1):(4 × 4) subnet			0.738348473943256...	
kagome – (1 × 1):(5 × 5) subnet			0.743548682503071...	
kagome – (1 × 1):(6 × 6) subnet			0.746418147634282...	
kagome – (2 × 2):(3 × 3) subnet				0.61091770(30)
triangular – 2 × 2 subnet	6,4			0.471628788
triangular – 3 × 3 subnet	6,4			0.509077793
triangular – 4 × 4 subnet	6,4			0.524364822
triangular – 5 × 5 subnet	6,4			0.5315976(10)
triangular – $\infty$ subnet	6,4			0.53993(1)

=== Thresholds of random sequentially adsorbed objects ===
(For more results and comparison to the jamming density, see Random sequential adsorption)

system	z	Site threshold
dimers on a honeycomb lattice	3	0.69, 0.6653
dimers on a triangular lattice	6	0.4872(8), 0.4873,
aligned linear dimers on a triangular lattice	6	0.5157(2)
aligned linear 4-mers on a triangular lattice	6	0.5220(2)
aligned linear 8-mers on a triangular lattice	6	0.5281(5)
aligned linear 12-mers on a triangular lattice	6	0.5298(8)
linear 16-mers on a triangular lattice	6	aligned 0.5328(7)
linear 32-mers on a triangular lattice	6	aligned 0.5407(6)
linear 64-mers on a triangular lattice	6	aligned 0.5455(4)
aligned linear 80-mers on a triangular lattice	6	0.5500(6)
aligned linear k $\longrightarrow \infty$ on a triangular lattice	6	0.582(9)
dimers and 5% impurities, triangular lattice	6	0.4832(7)
parallel dimers on a square lattice	4	0.5863
dimers on a square lattice	4	0.5617, 0.5618(1), 0.562, 0.5713
linear 3-mers on a square lattice	4	0.528
3-site 120° angle, 5% impurities, triangular lattice	6	0.4574(9)
3-site triangles, 5% impurities, triangular lattice	6	0.5222(9)
linear trimers and 5% impurities, triangular lattice	6	0.4603(8)
linear 4-mers on a square lattice	4	0.504
linear 5-mers on a square lattice	4	0.490
linear 6-mers on a square lattice	4	0.479
linear 8-mers on a square lattice	4	0.474, 0.4697(1)
linear 10-mers on a square lattice	4	0.469
linear 16-mers on a square lattice	4	0.4639(1)
linear 32-mers on a square lattice	4	0.4747(2)

The threshold gives the fraction of sites occupied by the objects when site percolation first takes place (not at full jamming). For longer k-mers see Ref.

=== Thresholds of full dimer coverings of two dimensional lattices ===
Here, we are dealing with networks that are obtained by covering a lattice with dimers, and then consider bond percolation on the remaining bonds. In discrete mathematics, this problem is known as the 'perfect matching' or the 'dimer covering' problem.

system	z	Bond threshold
Parallel covering, square lattice	6	0.381966...
Shifted covering, square lattice	6	0.347296...
Staggered covering, square lattice	6	0.376825(2)
Random covering, square lattice	6	0.367713(2)
Parallel covering, triangular lattice	10	0.237418...
Staggered covering, triangular lattice	10	0.237497(2)
Random covering, triangular lattice	10	0.235340(1)

=== Thresholds of polymers (random walks) on a square lattice ===
System is composed of ordinary (non-avoiding) random walks of length l on the square lattice.

l (polymer length)	z	Bond percolation
1	4	0.5(exact)
2	4	0.47697(4)
4	4	0.44892(6)
8	4	0.41880(4)

=== Thresholds of self-avoiding walks of length k added by random sequential adsorption ===
k	z	Site thresholds	Bond thresholds
1	4	0.593(2)	0.5009(2)
2	4	0.564(2)	0.4859(2)
3	4	0.552(2)	0.4732(2)
4	4	0.542(2)	0.4630(2)
5	4	0.531(2)	0.4565(2)
6	4	0.522(2)	0.4497(2)
7	4	0.511(2)	0.4423(2)
8	4	0.502(2)	0.4348(2)
9	4	0.493(2)	0.4291(2)
10	4	0.488(2)	0.4232(2)
11	4	0.482(2)	0.4159(2)
12	4	0.476(2)	0.4114(2)
13	4	0.471(2)	0.4061(2)
14	4	0.467(2)	0.4011(2)
15	4	0.4011(2)	0.3979(2)

=== Thresholds on 2D inhomogeneous lattices ===
Lattice	z	Site percolation threshold	Bond percolation threshold
bow-tie with p = 1/2 on one non-diagonal bond	3		0.3819654(5), $(3 - \sqrt{5})/2$

=== Thresholds for 2D continuum models ===
System	Φ_{c}	η_{c}	n_{c}
Disks of radius r	0.67634831(2), 0.6763475(6), 0.676339(4), 0.6764(4), 0.6766(5), 0.676(2), 0.679, 0.674 0.676, 0.680	1.1280867(5), 1.1276(9), 1.12808737(6), 1.128085(2), 1.128059(12), 1.13, 0.8	1.43632505(10), 1.43632545(8), 1.436322(2), 1.436289(16), 1.436320(4), 1.436323(3), 1.438(2), 1.216 (48)
Disks of uniform radius (0,r)	0.686610(7), 0.6860(12), 0.680		$\rho_c r^2$ = 1.108010(7)
Ellipses, ε = 1.5	0.0043	0.00431	2.059081(7)
Ellipses, ε = 5/3	0.65	1.05	2.28
Ellipses, ε = 2	0.6287945(12), 0.63	0.991000(3), 0.99	2.523560(8), 2.5
Ellipses, ε = 3	0.56	0.82	3.157339(8), 3.14
Ellipses, ε = 4	0.5	0.69	3.569706(8), 3.5
Ellipses, ε = 5	0.455, 0.455, 0.46	0.607	3.861262(12), 3.86
Ellipses, ε = 6			4.079365(17)
Ellipses, ε = 7			4.249132(16)
Ellipses, ε = 8			4.385302(15)
Ellipses, ε = 9			4.497000(8)
Ellipses, ε = 10	0.301, 0.303, 0.30	0.358 0.36	4.590416(23) 4.56, 4.5
Ellipses, ε = 15			4.894752(30)
Ellipses, ε = 20	0.178, 0.17	0.196	5.062313(39), 4.99
Ellipses, ε = 50	0.081	0.084	5.393863(28), 5.38
Ellipses, ε = 100	0.0417	0.0426	5.513464(40), 5.42
Ellipses, ε = 200	0.021	0.0212	5.40
Ellipses, ε = 1000	0.0043	0.00431	5.624756(22), 5.5
Superellipses, ε = 1, m = 1.5	0.671		
Superellipses, ε = 2.5, m = 1.5	0.599		
Superellipses, ε = 5, m = 1.5	0.469		
Superellipses, ε = 10, m = 1.5	0.322		
disco-rectangles, ε = 1.5			1.894
disco-rectangles, ε = 2			2.245
curved discorectangle, α=5,θ= $\pi/2$	0.461		
curved discorectangle, α=10,θ= $\pi/2$	0.336		
curved discorectangle, α=100,θ= $\pi/2$	0.059		
curved discorectangle, α=10,θ= $\pi$	0.376		
curved discorectangle, α=10,θ= 2$\pi$	0.567		
Aligned squares of side $\ell$	0.66675(2), 0.66674349(3), 0.66653(1), 0.6666(4), 0.668	1.09884280(9), 1.0982(3), 1.098(1)	1.09884280(9), 1.0982(3), 1.098(1)
Randomly oriented squares	0.62554075(4), 0.6254(2) 0.625,	0.9822723(1), 0.9819(6) 0.982278(14)	0.9822723(1), 0.9819(6) 0.982278(14)
Randomly oriented squares within angle $\pi/4$	0.6255(1)	0.98216(15)	
Rectangles, ε = 1.1	0.624870(7)	0.980484(19)	1.078532(21)
Rectangles, ε = 2	0.590635(5)	0.893147(13)	1.786294(26)
Rectangles, ε = 3	0.5405983(34)	0.777830(7)	2.333491(22)
Rectangles, ε = 4	0.4948145(38)	0.682830(8)	2.731318(30)
Rectangles, ε = 5	0.4551398(31), 0.451	0.607226(6)	3.036130(28)
Rectangles, ε = 10	0.3233507(25), 0.319	0.3906022(37)	3.906022(37)
Rectangles, ε = 20	0.2048518(22)	0.2292268(27)	4.584535(54)
Rectangles, ε = 50	0.09785513(36)	0.1029802(4)	5.149008(20)
Rectangles, ε = 100	0.0523676(6)	0.0537886(6)	5.378856(60)
Rectangles, ε = 200	0.02714526(34)	0.02752050(35)	5.504099(69)
Rectangles, ε = 1000	0.00559424(6)	0.00560995(6)	5.609947(60)
Sticks (needles) of length $\ell$			5.637348(10), 5.63726(2), 5.6372858(6), 5.637263(11), 5.63724(18)
Stacked 3D sticks of length $\ell$ and diameter $d$			5.850923(14)
sticks with log-normal length dist. STD=0.5			4.756(3)
sticks with correlated angle dist. s=0.5			6.6076(4)
Power-law disks, x = 2.05	0.993(1)	4.90(1)	0.0380(6)
Power-law disks, x = 2.25	0.8591(5)	1.959(5)	0.06930(12)
Power-law disks, x = 2.5	0.7836(4)	1.5307(17)	0.09745(11)
Power-law disks, x = 4	0.69543(6)	1.18853(19)	0.18916(3)
Power-law disks, x = 5	0.68643(13)	1.1597(3)	0.22149(8)
Power-law disks, x = 6	0.68241(8)	1.1470(1)	0.24340(5)
Power-law disks, x = 7	0.6803(8)	1.140(6)	0.25933(16)
Power-law disks, x = 8	0.67917(9)	1.1368(5)	0.27140(7)
Power-law disks, x = 9	0.67856(12)	1.1349(4)	0.28098(9)
Voids around disks of radius r	1 − Φ_{c}(disk) = 0.32355169(2), 0.318(2), 0.3261(6)		

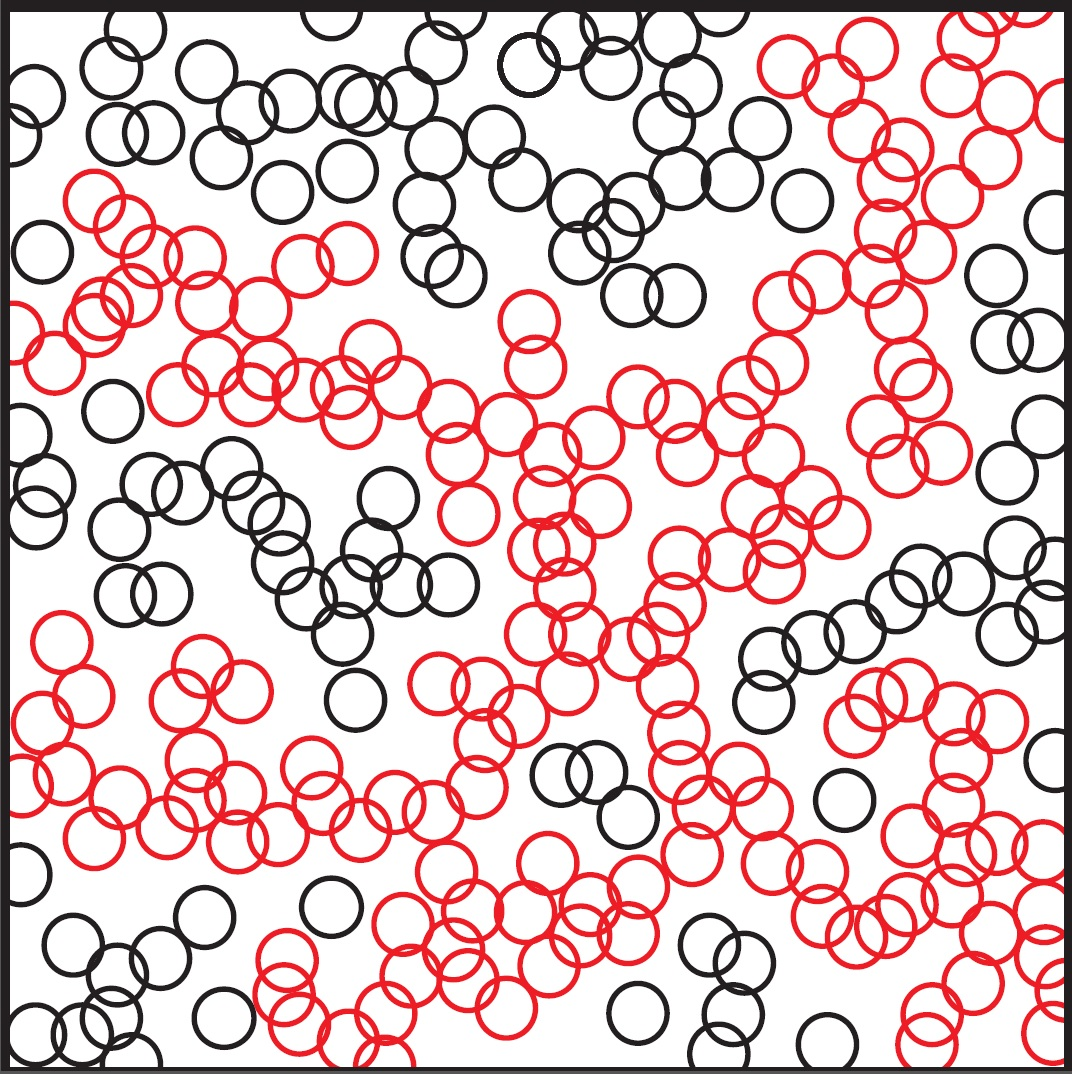
2D continuum percolation with disks

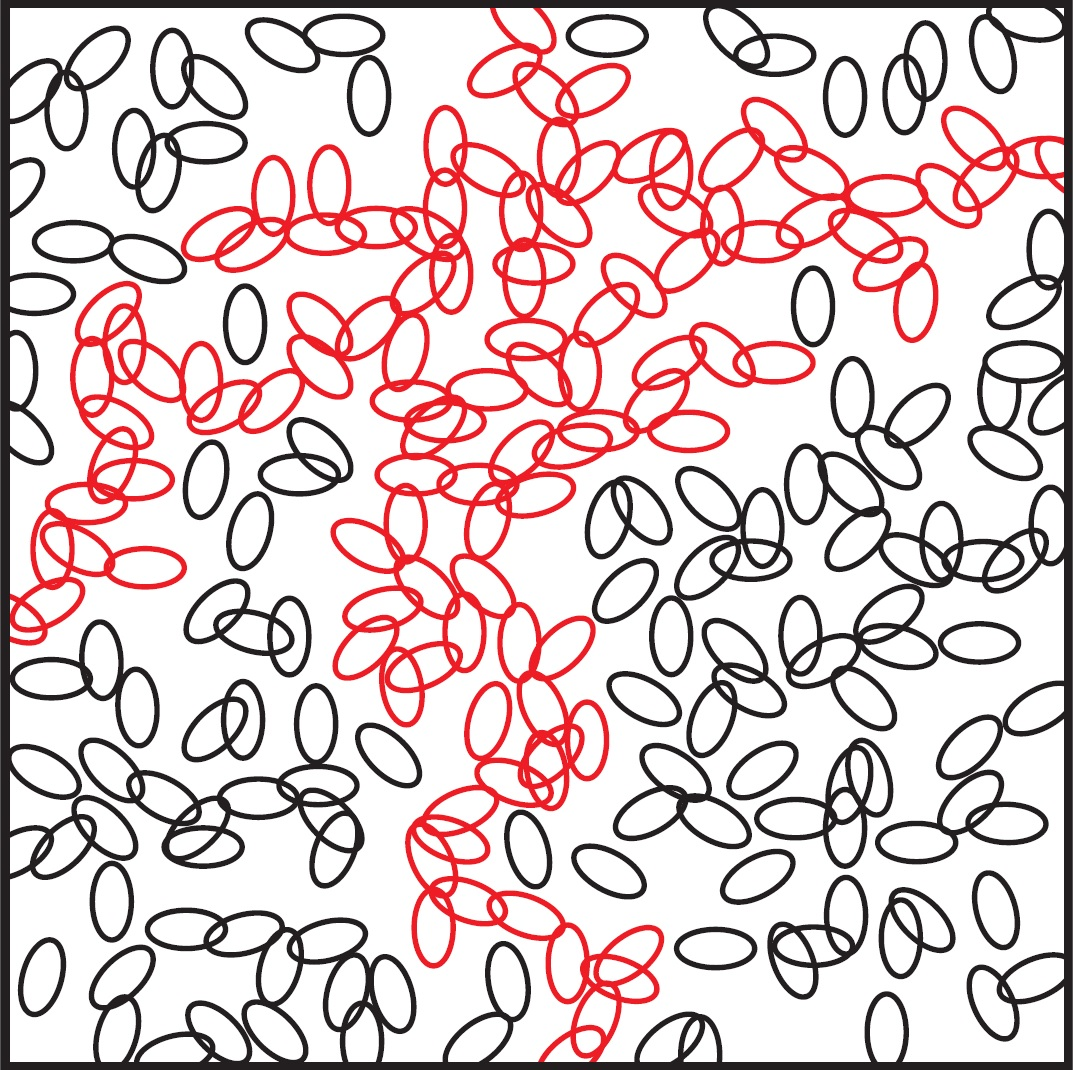
2D continuum percolation with ellipses of aspect ratio 2

For disks, $n_c = 4 r^2 N / L^2$ equals the critical number of disks per unit area, measured in units of the diameter $2r$, where $N$ is the number of objects and $L$ is the system size

For disks, $\eta_c = \pi r^2 N / L^2 = (\pi/4) n_c$ equals critical total disk area.

$4 \eta_c$ gives the number of disk centers within the circle of influence (radius 2 r).

$r_c = L \sqrt{\frac{\eta_c}{\pi N}} = \frac{L}{2} \sqrt{\frac{n_c}{N}}$ is the critical disk radius.

$\eta_c = \pi a b N / L^2$ for ellipses of semi-major and semi-minor axes of a and b, respectively. Aspect ratio $\epsilon = a / b$ with $a > b$.

$\eta_c = \ell m N / L^2$ for rectangles of dimensions $\ell$ and $m$. Aspect ratio $\epsilon = \ell / m$ with $\ell > m$.

$\eta_c = \pi \times N / (4 L^2 (x-2))$ for power-law distributed disks with $\hbox{Prob(radius}\ge R) = R^{-x}$, $R \ge 1$.

$\phi_c = 1 - e^{-\eta_c}$ equals critical area fraction.

For disks, Ref. use $\phi_c = 1 - e^{-\pi \times / 2}$ where $x$ is the density of disks of radius $1/\sqrt{2}$.

$n_c = \ell^2 N / L^2$ equals number of objects of maximum length $\ell = 2 a$ per unit area.

For ellipses, $n_c = (4 \epsilon / \pi)\eta_c$

For void percolation, $\phi_c = e^{-\eta_c}$ is the critical void fraction.

For more ellipse values, see

For more rectangle values, see

Both ellipses and rectangles belong to the superellipses, with $|x/a|^{2m}+|y/b|^{2m}=1$. For more percolation values of superellipses, see.

For the monodisperse particle systems, the percolation thresholds of concave-shaped superdisks are obtained as seen in

For binary dispersions of disks, see

=== Thresholds on 2D random and quasi-lattices ===
Voronoi diagram (solid lines) and its dual, the Delaunay triangulation (dotted lines), for a Poisson distribution of points

Delaunay triangulation

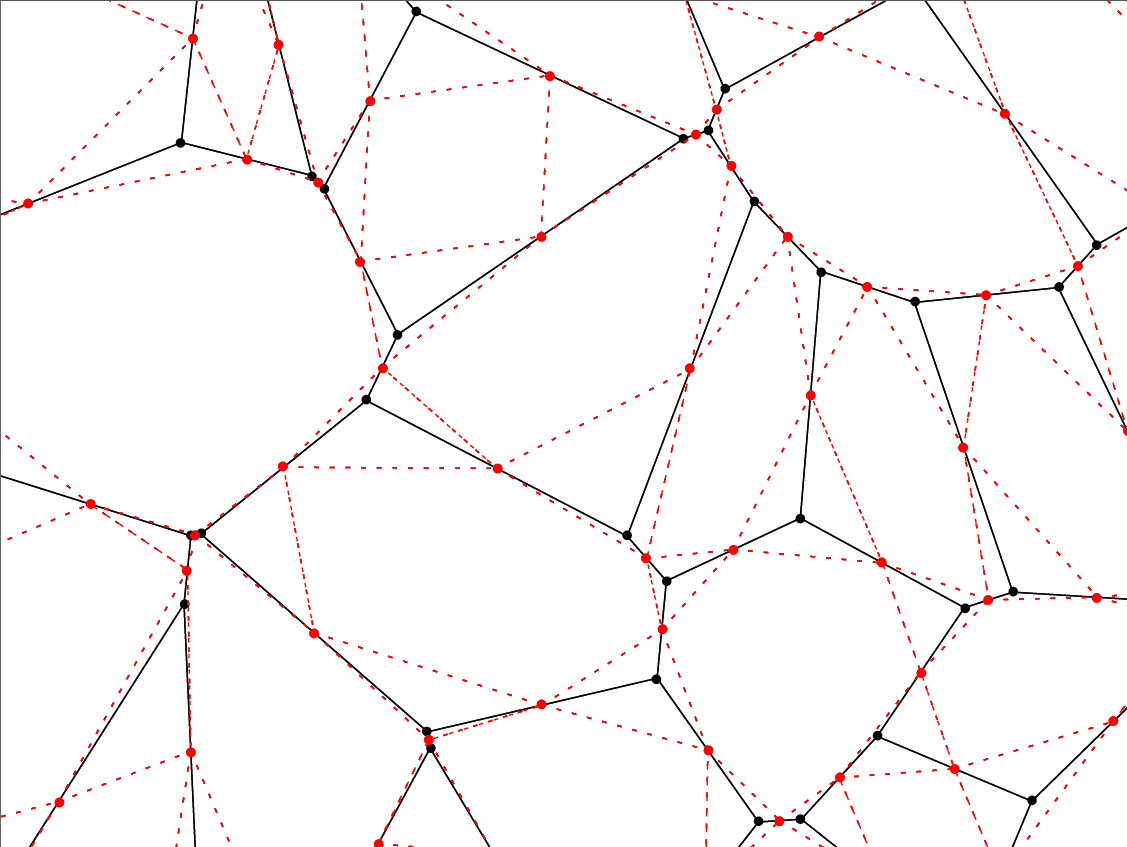
The Voronoi covering or line graph (dotted red lines) and the Voronoi diagram (black lines)

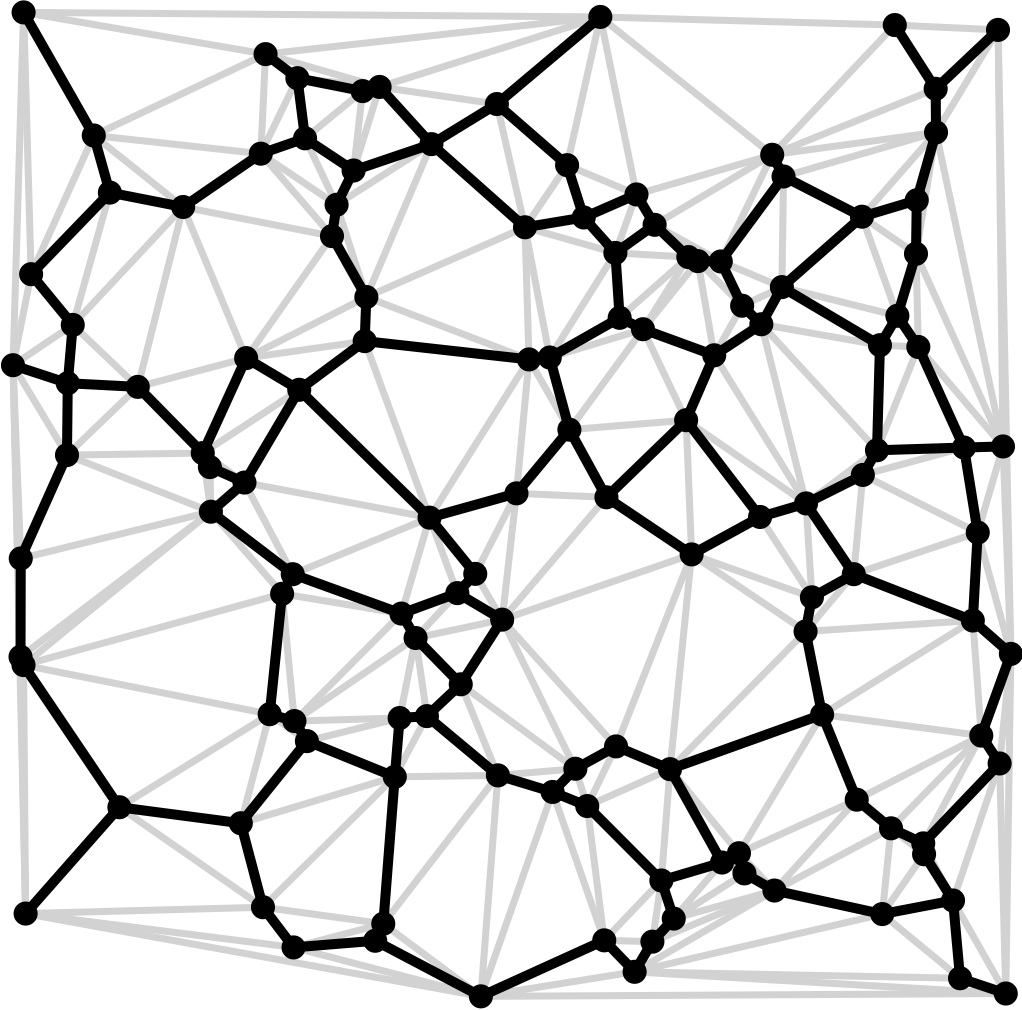
The Relative Neighborhood Graph (black lines) superimposed on the Delaunay triangulation (black plus grey lines).

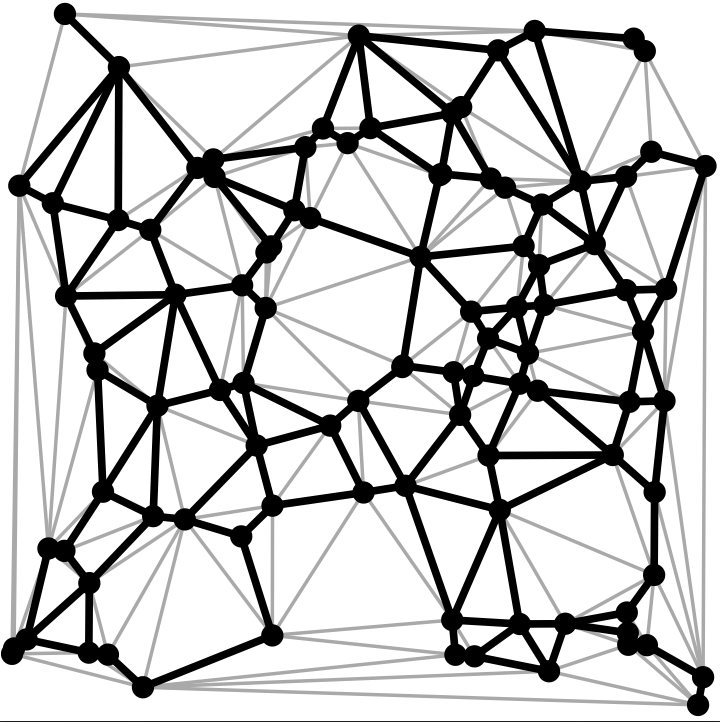
The Gabriel Graph, a subgraph of the Delaunay triangulation in which the circle surrounding each edge does not enclose any other points of the graph

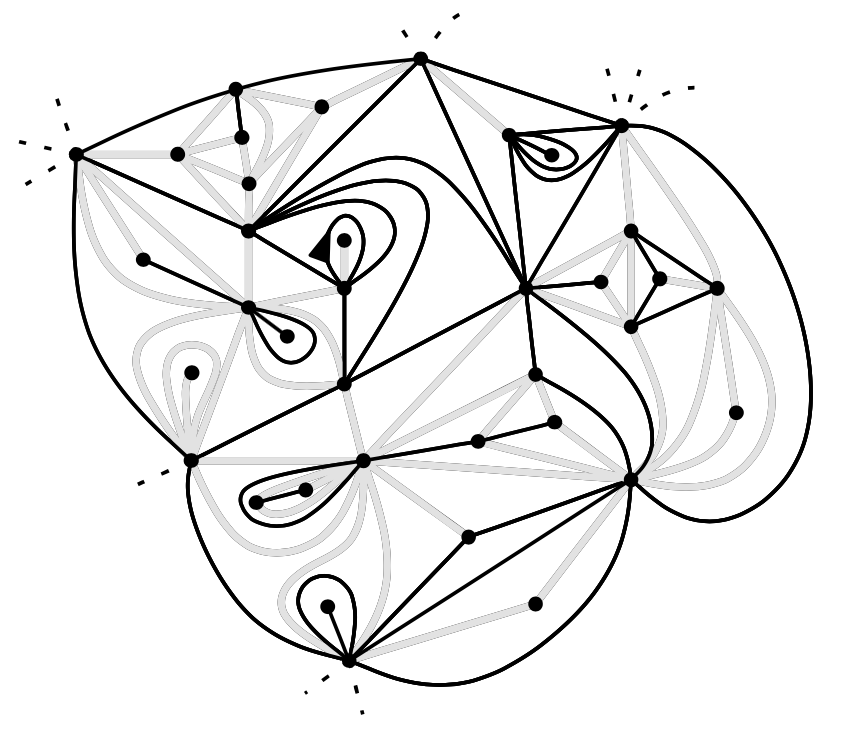
Uniform Infinite Planar Triangulation, showing bond clusters. From

Lattice	z	$\overline z$	Site percolation threshold	Bond percolation threshold
Relative neighborhood graph		2.5576	0.796(2)	0.771(2)
Voronoi tessellation	3		0.71410(2), 0.7151*	0.68, 0.6670(1), 0.6680(5), 0.666931(5)
Voronoi covering/medial	4		0.666931(2)	0.53618(2)
Randomized kagome/square-octagon, fraction r=1/2	4		0.6599	
Penrose rhomb dual	4		0.6381(3)	0.5233(2)
Gabriel graph		4	0.6348(8), 0.62	0.5167(6), 0.52
Random-line tessellation, dual		4	0.586(2)	
Penrose rhomb		4	0.5837(3), 0.5610(6) (weighted bonds) 0.58391(1)	0.483(5), 0.4770(2)
Octagonal lattice, "chemical" links (Ammann–Beenker tiling)		4	0.585	0.48
Octagonal lattice, "ferromagnetic" links		5.17	0.543	0.40
Dodecagonal lattice, "chemical" links		3.63	0.628	0.54
Dodecagonal lattice, "ferromagnetic" links		4.27	0.617	0.495
Delaunay triangulation		6	1/2	0.3333(1) 0.3326(5), 0.333069(2)
Uniform Infinite Planar Triangulation		6	1/2	(2√3 – 1)/11 ≈ 0.2240

*Theoretical estimate

=== Thresholds on 2D correlated systems ===
Assuming power-law correlations $C(r) \sim |r|^{-\alpha}$

lattice	α	Site percolation threshold	Bond percolation threshold
square	3	0.561406(4)	
square	2	0.550143(5)	
square	0.1	0.508(4)	

=== Thresholds on slabs ===
h is the thickness of the slab, h × ∞ × ∞. Boundary conditions (b.c.) refer to the top and bottom planes of the slab.

Lattice	h	z	$\overline z$	Site percolation threshold	Bond percolation threshold
simple cubic (open b.c.)	2	5	5	0.47424, 0.4756	
bcc (open b.c.)	2			0.4155	
hcp (open b.c.)	2			0.2828	
diamond (open b.c.)	2			0.5451	
simple cubic (open b.c.)	3			0.4264	
bcc (open b.c.)	3			0.3531	
bcc (periodic b.c.)	3				0.21113018(38)
hcp (open b.c.)	3			0.2548	
diamond (open b.c.)	3			0.5044	
simple cubic (open b.c.)	4			0.3997, 0.3998	
bcc (open b.c.)	4			0.3232	
bcc (periodic b.c.)	4				0.20235168(59)
hcp (open b.c.)	4			0.2405	
diamond (open b.c.)	4			0.4842	
simple cubic (periodic b.c.)	5	6	6		0.278102(5)
simple cubic (open b.c.)	6			0.3708	
simple cubic (periodic b.c.)	6	6	6		0.272380(2)
bcc (open b.c.)	6			0.2948	
hcp (open b.c.)	6			0.2261	
diamond (open b.c.)	6			0.4642	
simple cubic (periodic b.c.)	7	6	6	0.3459514(12)	0.268459(1)
simple cubic (open b.c.)	8			0.3557, 0.3565	
simple cubic (periodic b.c.)	8	6	6		0.265615(5)
bcc (open b.c.)	8			0.2811	
hcp (open b.c.)	8			0.2190	
diamond (open b.c.)	8			0.4549	
simple cubic (open b.c.)	12			0.3411	
bcc (open b.c.)	12			0.2688	
hcp (open b.c.)	12			0.2117	
diamond (open b.c.)	12			0.4456	
simple cubic (open b.c.)	16			0.3219, 0.3339	
bcc (open b.c.)	16			0.2622	
hcp (open b.c.)	16			0.2086	
diamond (open b.c.)	16			0.4415	
simple cubic (open b.c.)	32			0.3219,	
simple cubic (open b.c.)	64			0.3165,	
simple cubic (open b.c.)	128			0.31398,	

== Percolation in 3D ==
Lattice	z	$\overline z$	filling factor*	filling fraction*	Site percolation threshold	Bond percolation threshold
(10,3)-a oxide (or site-bond)	2^{3} 3^{2}	2.4			0.748713(22)	= (p_{c,bond}(10,3) – a)^{1/2} = 0.742334(25)
(10,3)-b oxide (or site-bond)	2^{3} 3^{2}	2.4	0.233	0.174	0.745317(25)	= (p_{c,bond}(10,3) – b)^{1/2} = 0.739388(22)
silicon dioxide (diamond site-bond)	4,2^{2}	2 2/3			0.638683(35)	
Modified (10,3)-b	3^{2},2	2 2/3				0.627
(8,3)-a	3	3			0.577962(33)	0.555700(22)
(10,3)-a gyroid	3	3			0.571404(40)	0.551060(37)
(10,3)-b	3	3			0.565442(40)	0.546694(33)
cubic oxide (cubic site-bond)	6,2^{3}	3.5			0.524652(50)	
bcc dual		4			0.4560(6)	0.4031(6)
ice Ih	4	4	π √3 / 16 = 0.340087	0.147	0.433(11)	0.388(10)
diamond (Ice Ic)	4	4	π √3 / 16 = 0.340087	0.1462332	0.4299(8), 0.4299870(4), 0.426+0.08 −0.02, 0.4297(4) 0.4301(4), 0.428(4), 0.425(15), 0.425, 0.436(12)	0.3895892(5), 0.3893(2), 0.3893(3), 0.388(5), 0.3886(5), 0.388(5) 0.390(11)
diamond dual		6 2/3			0.3904(5)	0.2350(5)
3D kagome (covering graph of the diamond lattice)	6		π √2 / 12 = 0.37024	0.1442	0.3895(2) =p_{c}(site) for diamond dual and p_{c}(bond) for diamond lattice	0.2709(6)
Bow-tie stack dual		5 1/3			0.3480(4)	0.2853(4)
honeycomb stack	5	5			0.3701(2)	0.3093(2)
octagonal stack dual	5	5			0.3840(4)	0.3168(4)
pentagonal stack		5 1/3			0.3394(4)	0.2793(4)
kagome stack	6	6	0.453450	0.1517	0.3346(4)	0.2563(2)
fcc dual	4^{2},8	5 1/3			0.3341(5)	0.2703(3)
simple cubic	6	6	π / 6 = 0.5235988	0.1631574	0.307(10), 0.307, 0.3115(5), 0.3116077(2), 0.311604(6), 0.311605(5), 0.311600(5), 0.3116077(4), 0.3116081(13), 0.3116080(4), 0.3116060(48), 0.3116004(35), 0.31160768(15)	0.247(5), 0.2479(4), 0.2488(2), 0.24881182(10), 0.2488125(25), 0.2488126(5),
hcp dual	4^{4},8^{2}	5 1/3			0.3101(5)	0.2573(3)
dice stack	5,8	6	π √3 / 9 = 0.604600	0.1813	0.2998(4)	0.2378(4)
bow-tie stack	7	7			0.2822(6)	0.2092(4)
Stacked triangular / simple hexagonal	8	8			0.26240(5), 0.2625(2), 0.2623(2)	0.18602(2), 0.1859(2)
octagonal (union-jack) stack	6,10	8			0.2524(6)	0.1752(2)
bcc	8	8			0.243(10), 0.243, 0.2459615(10), 0.2460(3), 0.2464(7), 0.2458(2)	0.178(5), 0.1795(3), 0.18025(15), 0.1802875(10)
simple cubic with 3NN (same as bcc)	8	8			0.2455(1), 0.2457(7)	
fcc, D_{3}	12	12	π / (3 √2) = 0.740480	0.147530	0.195, 0.198(3), 0.1998(6), 0.1992365(10), 0.19923517(20), 0.1994(2), 0.199236(4)	0.1198(3), 0.1201635(10) 0.120169(2)
hcp	12	12	π / (3 √2) = 0.740480	0.147545	0.195(5), 0.1992555(10)	0.1201640(10), 0.119(2)
La_{2−x} Sr_{x} Cu O_{4}	12	12			0.19927(2)	
simple cubic with 2NN (same as fcc)	12	12			0.1991(1)	
simple cubic with NN+4NN	12	12			0.15040(12), 0.1503793(7)	0.1068263(7)
simple cubic with 3NN+4NN	14	14			0.20490(12)	0.1012133(7)
bcc NN+2NN (= sc(3,4) sc-3NN+4NN)	14	14			0.175, 0.1686,(20) 0.1759432(8)	0.0991(5), 0.1012133(7), 0.1759432(8)
Nanotube fibers on FCC	14	14			0.1533(13)	
simple cubic with NN+3NN	14	14			0.1420(1)	0.0920213(7)
simple cubic with 2NN+4NN	18	18			0.15950(12)	0.0751589(9)
simple cubic with NN+2NN	18	18			0.137, 0.136, 0.1372(1), 0.13735(5), 0.1373045(5)	0.0752326(6)
fcc with NN+2NN (=sc-2NN+4NN)	18	18			0.136, 0.1361408(8)	0.0751589(9)
simple cubic with short-length correlation	6+	6+			0.126(1)	
simple cubic with NN+3NN+4NN	20	20			0.11920(12)	0.0624379(9)
simple cubic with 2NN+3NN	20	20			0.1036(1)	0.0629283(7)
simple cubic with NN+2NN+4NN	24	24			0.11440(12)	0.0533056(6)
simple cubic with 2NN+3NN+4NN	26	26			0.11330(12)	0.0474609(9)
simple cubic with NN+2NN+3NN	26	26			0.097, 0.0976(1), 0.0976445(10), 0.0976444(6)	0.0497080(10)
bcc with NN+2NN+3NN	26	26			0.095, 0.0959084(6)	0.0492760(10)
simple cubic with NN+2NN+3NN+4NN	32	32			0.10000(12), 0.0801171(9)	0.0392312(8)
fcc with NN+2NN+3NN	42	42			0.061, 0.0610(5), 0.0618842(8)	0.0290193(7)
fcc with NN+2NN+3NN+4NN	54	54			0.0500(5)	
sc-1,2,3,4,5 simple cubic with NN+2NN+3NN+4NN+5NN	56	56			0.0461815(5)	0.0210977(7)
sc-1,...,6 (2x2x2 cube)	80	80			0.0337049(9), 0.03373(13)	0.0143950(10)
sc-1,...,7	92	92			0.0290800(10)	0.0123632(8)
sc-1,...,8	122	122			0.0218686(6)	0.0091337(7)
sc-1,...,9	146	146			0.0184060(10)	0.0075532(8)
sc-1,...,10	170	170				0.0064352(8)
sc-1,...,11	178	178				0.0061312(8)
sc-1,...,12	202	202				0.0053670(10)
sc-1,...,13	250	250				0.0042962(8)
3x3x3 cube	274	274			φ_{c}= 0.76564(1), p_{c} = 0.0098417(7), 0.009854(6)	
4x4x4 cube	636	636			φ_{c}=0.76362(1), p_{c} = 0.0042050(2), 0.004217(3)	
5x5x5 cube	1214	1250			φ_{c}=0.76044(2), p_{c} = 0.0021885(2), 0.002185(4)	
6x6x6 cube	2056	2056			0.001289(2)	

Filling factor = fraction of space filled by touching spheres at every lattice site (for systems with uniform bond length only). Also called Atomic Packing Factor.

Filling fraction (or Critical Filling Fraction) = filling factor * p_{c}(site).

NN = nearest neighbor, 2NN = next-nearest neighbor, 3NN = next-next-nearest neighbor, etc.

kxkxk cubes are cubes of occupied sites on a lattice, and are equivalent to extended-range percolation of a cube of length (2k+1), with edges and corners removed, with z = (2k+1)^{3}-12(2k-1)-9 (center site not counted in z).

Question: the bond thresholds for the hcp and fcc lattice agree within the small statistical error. Are they identical, and if not, how far apart are they? Which threshold is expected to be bigger? Similarly for the ice and diamond lattices. See

System	polymer Φ_{c}
percolating excluded volume of athermal polymer matrix (bond-fluctuation model on cubic lattice)	0.4304(3)

=== 3D distorted lattices ===
Here, one distorts a regular lattice of unit spacing by moving vertices uniformly within the cube $(x-\alpha,x+\alpha),(y-\alpha,y+\alpha),(z-\alpha,z+\alpha)$, and considers percolation when sites are within Euclidean distance $d$ of each other.

Lattice	$\overline z$	$\alpha$	$d$	Site percolation threshold	Bond percolation threshold
cubic		0.05	1.0	0.60254(3)	
		0.1	1.00625	0.58688(4)	
		0.15	1.025	0.55075(2)	
		0.175	1.05	0.50645(5)	
		0.2	1.1	0.44342(3)	

=== Overlapping shapes on 3D lattices ===
Site threshold is the number of overlapping objects per lattice site. The coverage φ_{c} is the net fraction of sites covered, and v is the volume (number of cubes). Overlapping cubes are given in the section on thresholds of 3D lattices. Here z is the coordination number to k-mers of either orientation, with $z=6k^2+18k-4$

System	k	z	Site coverage φ_{c}	Site percolation threshold p_{c}
1 × 2 dimer, cubic lattice	2	56	0.24542	0.045847(2)
1 × 3 trimer, cubic lattice	3	104	0.19578	0.023919(9)
1 × 4 stick, cubic lattice	4	164	0.16055	0.014478(7)
1 × 5 stick, cubic lattice	5	236	0.13488	0.009613(8)
1 × 6 stick, cubic lattice	6	320	0.11569	0.006807(2)
2 × 2 plaquette, cubic lattice	2		0.22710	0.021238(2)
3 × 3 plaquette, cubic lattice	3		0.18686	0.007632(5)
4 × 4 plaquette, cubic lattice	4		0.16159	0.003665(3)
5 × 5 plaquette, cubic lattice	5		0.14316	0.002058(5)
6 × 6 plaquette, cubic lattice	6		0.12900	0.001278(5)

The coverage is calculated from $p_c$ by $\phi_c = 1-(1-p_c)^{3 k}$ for sticks, and $\phi_c = 1-(1-p_c)^{3 k^2}$ for plaquettes.

=== Dimer percolation in 3D ===
System	Site percolation threshold	Bond percolation threshold
Simple cubic		0.2555(1)

=== Thresholds for 3D continuum models ===
All overlapping except for jammed spheres and polymer matrix.

System	Φ_{c}	η_{c}
Spheres of radius r	0.289, 0.293, 0.286, 0.295. 0.2895(5), 0.28955(7), 0.2896(7), 0.289573(2), 0.2896, 0.2854, 0.290, 0.290, 0.2895693(26)	0.3418(7), 0.3438(13), 0.341889(3), 0.3360, 0.34189(2) [corrected], 0.341935(8), 0.335,
Oblate ellipsoids with major radius r and aspect ratio 4/3	0.2831	0.3328
Prolate ellipsoids with minor radius r and aspect ratio 3/2	0.2757, 0.2795, 0.2763	0.3278
Oblate ellipsoids with major radius r and aspect ratio 2	0.2537, 0.2629, 0.254	0.3050
Prolate ellipsoids with minor radius r and aspect ratio 2	0.2537, 0.2618, 0.25(2), 0.2507	0.3035, 0.29(3)
Oblate ellipsoids with major radius r and aspect ratio 3	0.2289	0.2599
Prolate ellipsoids with minor radius r and aspect ratio 3	0.2033, 0.2244, 0.20(2)	0.2541, 0.22(3)
Oblate ellipsoids with major radius r and aspect ratio 4	0.2003	0.2235
Prolate ellipsoids with minor radius r and aspect ratio 4	0.1901, 0.16(2)	0.2108, 0.17(3)
Oblate ellipsoids with major radius r and aspect ratio 5	0.1757	0.1932
Prolate ellipsoids with minor radius r and aspect ratio 5	0.1627, 0.13(2)	0.1776, 0.15(2)
Oblate ellipsoids with major radius r and aspect ratio 10	0.0895, 0.1058	0.1118
Prolate ellipsoids with minor radius r and aspect ratio 10	0.0724, 0.08703, 0.07(2)	0.09105, 0.07(2)
Oblate ellipsoids with major radius r and aspect ratio 100	0.01248	0.01256
Prolate ellipsoids with minor radius r and aspect ratio 100	0.006949	0.006973
Oblate ellipsoids with major radius r and aspect ratio 1000	0.001275	0.001276
Oblate ellipsoids with major radius r and aspect ratio 2000	0.000637	0.000637
Spherocylinders with H/D = 1	0.2439(2)	
Spherocylinders with H/D = 4	0.1345(1)	
Spherocylinders with H/D = 10	0.06418(20)	
Spherocylinders with H/D = 50	0.01440(8)	
Spherocylinders with H/D = 100	0.007156(50)	
Spherocylinders with H/D = 200	0.003724(90)	
randomly oriented cylinders	0.000233	
Aligned cylinders	0.2819(2)	0.3312(1)
Aligned cubes of side $\ell = 2 a$	0.2773(2) 0.27727(2), 0.27730261(79)	0.3247(3), 0.3248(3), 0.32476(4) 0.324766(1)
Randomly oriented icosahedra		0.3030(5)
Randomly oriented dodecahedra		0.2949(5)
Randomly oriented octahedra		0.2514(6)
Randomly oriented cubes of side $\ell = 2 a$	0.2168(2) 0.2174,	0.2444(3), 0.2443(5)
Randomly oriented tetrahedra		0.1701(7)
Randomly oriented disks of radius r (in 3D)		0.9614(5)
Randomly oriented square plates of side $\sqrt{\pi} r$		0.8647(6)
Randomly oriented triangular plates of side $\sqrt{2 \pi} /3^{1/4} r$		0.7295(6)
3D curved fiber of aspect ratio α=4 and bending central angle θ=$\pi/2$	0.13207	
3D curved fiber of aspect ratio α=4 and bending central angle θ=$\pi$	0.18497	
3D curved fiber of aspect ratio α=4 and bending central angle θ=2$\pi$	0.28692	
3D curved fiber of aspect ratio α=10 and bending central angle θ=$\pi/2$	0.06872	
3D curved fiber of aspect ratio α=50 and bending central angle θ=$\pi/2$	0.01391	
3D curved fiber of aspect ratio α=100 and bending central angle θ=$\pi/2$	0.00881	
Jammed spheres (average z = 6)	0.183(3), 0.1990, see also contact network of jammed spheres below.	0.59(1) (volume fraction of all spheres)

$\eta_c = (4/3) \pi r^3 N / L^3$ is the total volume (for spheres), where N is the number of objects and L is the system size.

$\phi_c = 1 - e^{-\eta_c}$ is the critical volume fraction, valid for overlapping randomly placed objects.

For disks and plates, these are effective volumes and volume fractions.

For void ("Swiss-Cheese" model), $\phi_c = e^{-\eta_c}$ is the critical void fraction.

For more results on void percolation around ellipsoids and elliptical plates, see.

For more ellipsoid percolation values see.

For a discussion of the synergetic effect of shape and size-polydispersities of 2D ovals on the percolation threshold of crack networks in 3D space, see .The influence of shape and size polydispersities of pores and hard particles is a critical factor that must be considered in industrial practice. Preliminary works in this area may help improve our understanding of their significance for the macroscopic properties of composites materials

For spherocylinders, H/D is the ratio of the height to the diameter of the cylinder, which is then capped by hemispheres. Additional values are given in.

For superballs, m is the deformation parameter, the percolation values are given in., In addition, the thresholds of concave-shaped superballs are also determined in

For cuboid-like particles (superellipsoids), m is the deformation parameter, more percolation values are given in.

A study derived a mixing law for percolation in fractured porous media, combining overlapping 3D pores (superovoids) and 2D fractures (superovals). The model accounts for polydispersity in size and shape, validated through simulations and literature data. It bridges theoretical and applied percolation, aiding subsurface hydrology, cementitious materials, and nanocomposite design.

=== Void percolation in 3D ===
Void percolation refers to percolation in the space around overlapping objects. Here $\phi_c$ refers to the fraction of the space occupied by the voids (not of the particles) at the critical point, and is related to $\eta_c$ by $\phi_c = e^{-\eta_c}$. $\eta_c$ is defined as in the continuum percolation section above.

System	Φ_{c}	η_{c}
Voids around disks of radius r		22.86(2)
Voids around randomly oriented tetrahedra	0.0605(6)	
Voids around oblate ellipsoids of major radius r and aspect ratio 32	0.5308(7)	0.6333
Voids around oblate ellipsoids of major radius r and aspect ratio 16	0.3248(5)	1.125
Voids around oblate ellipsoids of major radius r and aspect ratio 10		1.542(1)
Voids around oblate ellipsoids of major radius r and aspect ratio 8	0.1615(4)	1.823
Voids around oblate ellipsoids of major radius r and aspect ratio 4	0.0711(2)	2.643, 2.618(5)
Voids around oblate ellipsoids of major radius r and aspect ratio 2		3.239(4)
Voids around prolate ellipsoids of aspect ratio 8	0.0415(7)	
Voids around prolate ellipsoids of aspect ratio 6	0.0397(7)	
Voids around prolate ellipsoids of aspect ratio 4	0.0376(7)	
Voids around prolate ellipsoids of aspect ratio 3	0.03503(50)	
Voids around prolate ellipsoids of aspect ratio 2	0.0323(5)	
Voids around aligned square prisms of aspect ratio 2	0.0379(5)	
Voids around randomly oriented square prisms of aspect ratio 20	0.0534(4)	
Voids around randomly oriented square prisms of aspect ratio 15	0.0535(4)	
Voids around randomly oriented square prisms of aspect ratio 10	0.0524(5)	
Voids around randomly oriented square prisms of aspect ratio 8	0.0523(6)	
Voids around randomly oriented square prisms of aspect ratio 7	0.0519(3)	
Voids around randomly oriented square prisms of aspect ratio 6	0.0519(5)	
Voids around randomly oriented square prisms of aspect ratio 5	0.0515(7)	
Voids around randomly oriented square prisms of aspect ratio 4	0.0505(7)	
Voids around randomly oriented square prisms of aspect ratio 3	0.0485(11)	
Voids around randomly oriented square prisms of aspect ratio 5/2	0.0483(8)	
Voids around randomly oriented square prisms of aspect ratio 2	0.0465(7)	
Voids around randomly oriented square prisms of aspect ratio 3/2	0.0461(14)	
Voids around hemispheres	0.0455(6)	
Voids around aligned tetrahedra	0.0605(6)	
Voids around randomly oriented tetrahedra	0.0605(6)	
Voids around aligned cubes	0.036(1), 0.0381(3)	
Voids around randomly oriented cubes	0.0452(6), 0.0449(5)	
Voids around aligned octahedra	0.0407(3)	
Voids around randomly oriented octahedra	0.0398(5)	
Voids around aligned dodecahedra	0.0356(3)	
Voids around randomly oriented dodecahedra	0.0360(3)	
Voids around aligned icosahedra	0.0346(3)	
Voids around randomly oriented icosahedra	0.0336(7)	
Voids around spheres	0.034(7), 0.032(4), 0.030(2), 0.0301(3), 0.0294, 0.0300(3), 0.0317(4), 0.0308(5) 0.0301(1), 0.0301(1)	3.506(8), 3.515(6), 3.510(2)

=== Thresholds on 3D random and quasi-lattices ===
Lattice	z	$\overline z$	Site percolation threshold	Bond percolation threshold
Contact network of packed spheres		6	0.310(5), 0.287(50), 0.3116(3),	
Random-plane tessellation, dual		6	0.290(7)	
Icosahedral Penrose		6	0.285	0.225
Penrose w/2 diagonals		6.764	0.271	0.207
Penrose w/8 diagonals		12.764	0.188	0.111
Voronoi network		15.54	0.1453(20)	0.0822(50)

=== Thresholds for other 3D models ===
Lattice	z	$\overline z$	Site percolation threshold	Critical coverage fraction $\phi_c$	Bond percolation threshold
Drilling percolation, simple cubic lattice*	6	6	0.6345(3), 0.6339(5), 0.633965(15)	0.25480	
Drill in z direction on cubic lattice, remove single sites	6	6	0.592746 (columns), 0.4695(10) (sites)	0.2784	
Random tube model, simple cubic lattice^{†}					0.231456(6)
Pac-Man percolation, simple cubic lattice					0.139(6)

$^*$ In drilling percolation, the site threshold $p_c$ represents the fraction of columns in each direction that have not been removed, and $\phi_c=p_c^3$. For the 1d drilling, we have $\phi_c = p_c$(columns) $p_c$(sites).

^{†} In tube percolation, the bond threshold represents the value of the parameter $\mu$ such that the probability of putting a bond between neighboring vertical tube segments is $1-e^{-\mu h_i}$, where $h_i$ is the overlap height of two adjacent tube segments.

== Thresholds in different dimensional spaces ==
=== Continuum models in higher dimensions ===
d	System	Φ_{c}	η_{c}
4	Overlapping hyperspheres	0.1223(4)	0.1300(13), 0.1304(5), 0.1210268(19)
4	Aligned hypercubes	0.1132(5), 0.1132348(17)	0.1201(6)
4	Voids around hyperspheres	0.00211(2)	6.161(10) 6.248(2),
5	Overlapping hyperspheres		0.0544(6), 0.05443(7), 0.0522524(69)
5	Aligned hypercubes	0.04900(7), 0.0481621(13)	0.05024(7)
5	Voids around hyperspheres	1.26(6)×10^{−4}	8.98(4), 9.170(8)
6	Overlapping hyperspheres		0.02391(31), 0.02339(5)
6	Aligned hypercubes	0.02082(8), 0.0213479(10)	0.02104(8)
6	Voids around hyperspheres	8.0(6)×10^{−6}	11.74(8), 12.24(2),
7	Overlapping hyperspheres		0.01102(16), 0.01051(3)
7	Aligned hypercubes	0.00999(5), 0.0097754(31)	0.01004(5)
7	Voids around hyperspheres		15.46(5)
8	Overlapping hyperspheres		0.00516(8), 0.004904(6)
8	Aligned hypercubes		0.004498(5)
8	Voids around hyperspheres		18.64(8)
9	Overlapping hyperspheres		0.002353(4)
9	Aligned hypercubes		0.002166(4)
9	Voids around hyperspheres		22.1(4)
10	Overlapping hyperspheres		0.001138(3)
10	Aligned hypercubes		0.001058(4)
11	Overlapping hyperspheres		0.0005530(3)
11	Aligned hypercubes		0.0005160(3)

$\eta_c = (\pi^{d/2}/ \Gamma[d/2 + 1]) r^d N / L^d.$

In 4d, $\eta_c = (1/2) \pi^2 r^4 N / L^4$.

In 5d, $\eta_c = (8/15) \pi^2 r^5 N / L^5$.

In 6d, $\eta_c = (1/6) \pi^3 r^6 N / L^6$.

$\phi_c = 1 - e^{-\eta_c}$ is the critical volume fraction, valid for overlapping objects.

For void models, $\phi_c = e^{-\eta_c}$ is the critical void fraction, and $\eta_c$ is the total volume of the overlapping objects

=== Thresholds on hypercubic lattices ===
d	z	Site thresholds	Bond thresholds
4	8	0.198(1) 0.197(6), 0.1968861(14), 0.196889(3), 0.196901(5), 0.19680(23), 0.1968904(65), 0.19688561(3)	0.1600(1), 0.16005(15), 0.1601314(13), 0.160130(3), 0.1601310(10), 0.1601312(2), 0.16013122(6)
5	10	0.141(1),0.198(1) 0.141(3), 0.1407966(15), 0.1407966(26), 0.14079633(4)	0.1181(1), 0.118(1), 0.11819(4), 0.118172(1), 0.1181718(3) 0.11817145(3)
6	12	0.106(1), 0.108(3), 0.109017(2), 0.1090117(30), 0.109016661(8)	0.0943(1), 0.0942(1), 0.0942019(6), 0.09420165(2)
7	14	0.05950(5), 0.088939(20), 0.0889511(9), 0.0889511(90), 0.088951121(1),	0.0787(1), 0.078685(30), 0.0786752(3), 0.078675230(2)
8	16	0.0752101(5), 0.075210128(1)	0.06770(5), 0.06770839(7), 0.0677084181(3)
9	18	0.0652095(3), 0.0652095348(6)	0.05950(5), 0.05949601(5), 0.0594960034(1)
10	20	0.0575930(1), 0.0575929488(4)	0.05309258(4), 0.0530925842(2)
11	22	0.05158971(8), 0.0515896843(2)	0.04794969(1), 0.04794968373(8)
12	24	0.04673099(6), 0.0467309755(1)	0.04372386(1), 0.04372385825(10)
13	26	0.04271508(8), 0.04271507960(10)	0.04018762(1), 0.04018761703(6)

For thresholds on high dimensional hypercubic lattices, we have the asymptotic series expansions

$p_c^\mathrm{site}(d)=\sigma^{-1}+\frac{3}{2}\sigma^{-2}+\frac{15}{4}\sigma^{-3}+\frac{83}{4}\sigma^{-4}+\frac{6577}{48}\sigma^{-5}+\frac{119077}{96}\sigma^{-6}+{\mathcal O}(\sigma^{-7})$

$p_c^\mathrm{bond}(d)=\sigma^{-1}+\frac{5}{2}\sigma^{-3}+\frac{15}{2}\sigma^{-4}+57\sigma^{-5}+\frac{4855}{12}\sigma^{-6}+{\mathcal O}(\sigma^{-7})$

where $\sigma = 2 d - 1$. For 13-dimensional bond percolation, for example, the error with the measured value is less than 10^{−6}, and these formulas can be useful for higher-dimensional systems.

=== Thresholds in other higher-dimensional lattices ===
d	lattice	z	Site thresholds	Bond thresholds
4	diamond	5	0.2978(2)	0.2715(3)
4	kagome	8	0.2715(3)	0.177(1)
4	bcc	16	0.1037(3)	0.074(1), 0.074212(1)
4	fcc, D_{4}, hypercubic 2NN	24	0.0842(3), 0.08410(23), 0.0842001(11)	0.049(1), 0.049517(1), 0.0495193(8)
4	hypercubic NN+2NN	32	0.06190(23), 0.0617731(19)	0.035827(1), 0.0338047(27)
4	hypercubic 3NN	32	0.04540(23)	
4	hypercubic NN+3NN	40	0.04000(23)	0.0271892(22)
4	hypercubic 2NN+3NN	56	0.03310(23)	0.0194075(15)
4	hypercubic NN+2NN+3NN	64	0.03190(23), 0.0319407(13)	0.0171036(11)
4	hypercubic NN+2NN+3NN+4NN	88	0.0231538(12)	0.0122088(8)
4	hypercubic NN+...+5NN	136	0.0147918(12)	0.0077389(9)
4	hypercubic NN+...+6NN	232	0.0088400(10)	0.0044656(11)
4	hypercubic NN+...+7NN	296	0.0070006(6)	0.0034812(7)
4	hypercubic NN+...+8NN	320	0.0064681(9)	0.0032143(8)
4	hypercubic NN+...+9NN	424	0.0048301(9)	0.0024117(7)
5	diamond	6	0.2252(3)	0.2084(4)
5	kagome	10	0.2084(4)	0.130(2)
5	bcc	32	0.0446(4)	0.033(1)
5	fcc, D_{5}, hypercubic 2NN	40	0.0431(3), 0.0435913(6)	0.026(2), 0.0271813(2)
5	hypercubic NN+2NN	50	0.0334(2)	0.0213(1)
6	diamond	7	0.1799(5)	0.1677(7)
6	kagome	12	0.1677(7)	
6	fcc, D_{6}	60	0.0252(5), 0.02602674(12)	0.01741556(5)
6	bcc	64	0.0199(5)	
6	E_{6}	72	0.02194021(14)	0.01443205(8)
7	fcc, D_{7}	84	0.01716730(5)	0.012217868(13)
7	E_{7}	126	0.01162306(4)	0.00808368(2)
8	fcc, D_{8}	112	0.01215392(4)	0.009081804(6)
8	E_{8}	240	0.00576991(2)	0.004202070(2)
9	fcc, D_{9}	144	0.00905870(2)	0.007028457(3)
9	$\Lambda_9$	272	0.00480839(2)	0.0037006865(11)
10	fcc, D_{10}	180	0.007016353(9)	0.005605579(6)
11	fcc, D_{11}	220	0.005597592(4)	0.004577155(3)
12	fcc, D_{12}	264	0.004571339(4)	0.003808960(2)
13	fcc, D_{13}	312	0.003804565(3)	0.0032197013(14)

=== Thresholds in one-dimensional long-range percolation ===
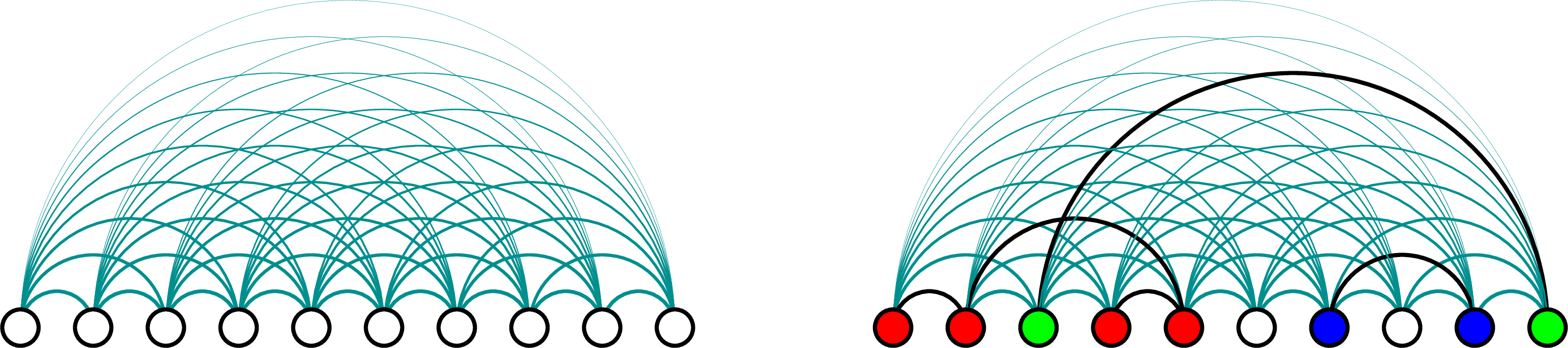
Long-range bond percolation model. The lines represent the possible bonds with width decreasing as the connection probability decreases (left panel). An instance of the model together with the clusters generated (right panel).

In a one-dimensional chain we establish bonds between distinct sites $i$ and $j$ with probability $p=\frac{C}{|i-j|^{1+\sigma}}$ decaying as a power-law with an exponent $\sigma>0$. Percolation occurs at a critical value $C_c<1$ for $\sigma<1$. The numerically determined percolation thresholds are given by:

$\sigma$	$C_c$	Critical thresholds $C_c$ as a function of $\sigma$. The dotted line is the rigorous lower bound.
0.1	0.047685(8)	
0.2	0.093211(16)	
0.3	0.140546(17)	
0.4	0.193471(15)	
0.5	0.25482(5)	
0.6	0.327098(6)	
0.7	0.413752(14)	
0.8	0.521001(14)	
0.9	0.66408(7)	

=== Thresholds on hyperbolic, hierarchical, and tree lattices ===
In these lattices there may be two percolation thresholds: the lower threshold is the probability above which infinite clusters appear, and the upper is the probability above which there is a unique infinite cluster.

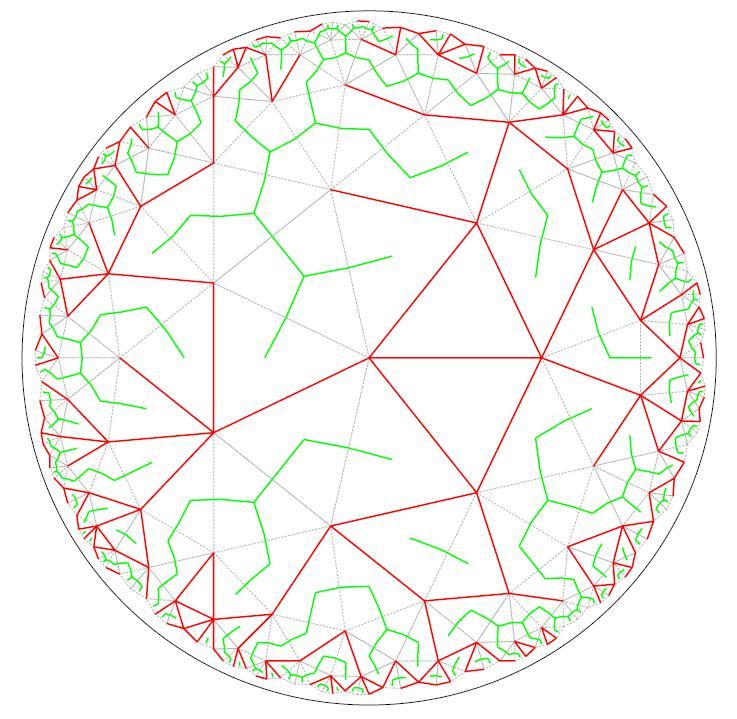
Visualization of a triangular hyperbolic lattice {3,7} projected on the Poincaré disk (red bonds). Green bonds show dual-clusters on the {7,3} lattice

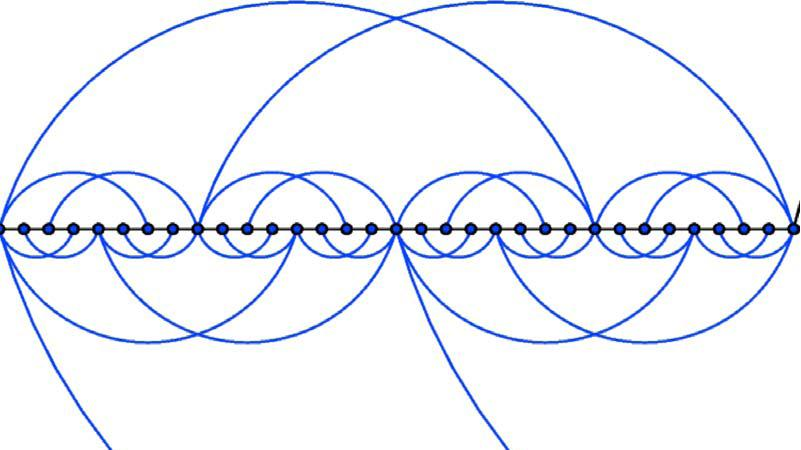
Depiction of the non-planar Hanoi network HN-NP

Lattice	z	$\overline z$	Site percolation threshold		Bond percolation threshold	
			Lower	Upper	Lower	Upper
{3,7} hyperbolic	7	7	0.26931171(7), 0.20	0.73068829(7), 0.73(2)	0.20, 0.1993505(5)	0.37, 0.4694754(8)
{3,8} hyperbolic	8	8	0.20878618(9)	0.79121382(9)	0.1601555(2)	0.4863559(6)
{3,9} hyperbolic	9	9	0.1715770(1)	0.8284230(1)	0.1355661(4)	0.4932908(1)
{4,5} hyperbolic	5	5	0.29890539(6)	0.8266384(5)	0.27, 0.2689195(3)	0.52, 0.6487772(3)
{4,6} hyperbolic	6	6	0.22330172(3)	0.87290362(7)	0.20714787(9)	0.6610951(2)
{4,7} hyperbolic	7	7	0.17979594(1)	0.89897645(3)	0.17004767(3)	0.66473420(4)
{4,8} hyperbolic	8	8	0.151035321(9)	0.91607962(7)	0.14467876(3)	0.66597370(3)
{4,9} hyperbolic	8	8	0.13045681(3)	0.92820305(3)	0.1260724(1)	0.66641596(2)
{5,5} hyperbolic	5	5	0.26186660(5)	0.89883342(7)	0.263(10), 0.25416087(3)	0.749(10) 0.74583913(3)
{7,3} hyperbolic	3	3	0.54710885(10)	0.8550371(5), 0.86(2)	0.53, 0.551(10), 0.5305246(8)	0.72, 0.810(10), 0.8006495(5)
{∞,3} Cayley tree	3	3	1/2		1/2	1
Enhanced binary tree (EBT)					0.304(1), 0.306(10), (√13 − 3)/2 = 0.302776	0.48, 0.564(1), 0.564(10), 1/2
Enhanced binary tree dual					0.436(1), 0.452(10)	0.696(1), 0.699(10)
Non-Planar Hanoi Network (HN-NP)					0.319445	0.381996
Cayley tree with grandparents		8			0.158656326	

Note: {m,n} is the Schläfli symbol, signifying a hyperbolic lattice in which n regular m-gons meet at every vertex

For bond percolation on {P,Q}, we have by duality $p_{c,\ell}(P,Q) + p_{c,u}(Q,P) = 1$. For site percolation, $p_{c,\ell}(3,Q) + p_{c,u}(3,Q) = 1$ because of the self-matching of triangulated lattices.

Cayley tree (Bethe lattice) with coordination number $z : p_c = 1 / ( z - 1 )$

=== Thresholds for directed percolation ===
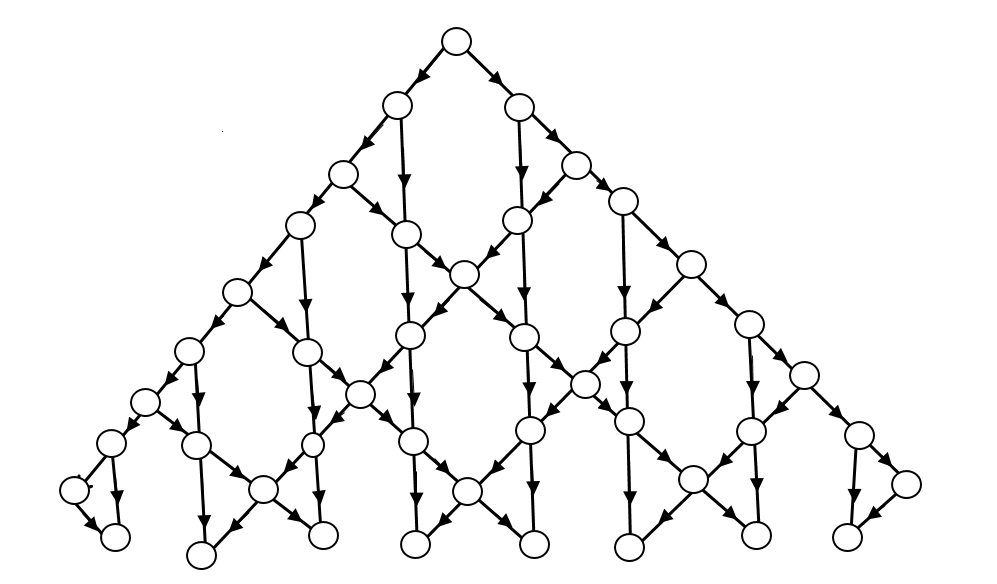
(1+1)d Kagome Lattice

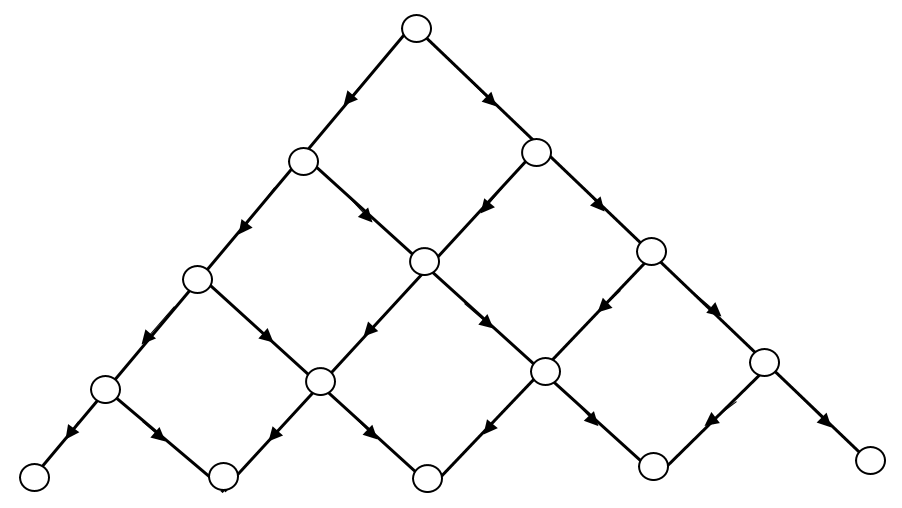
(1+1)d Square Lattice

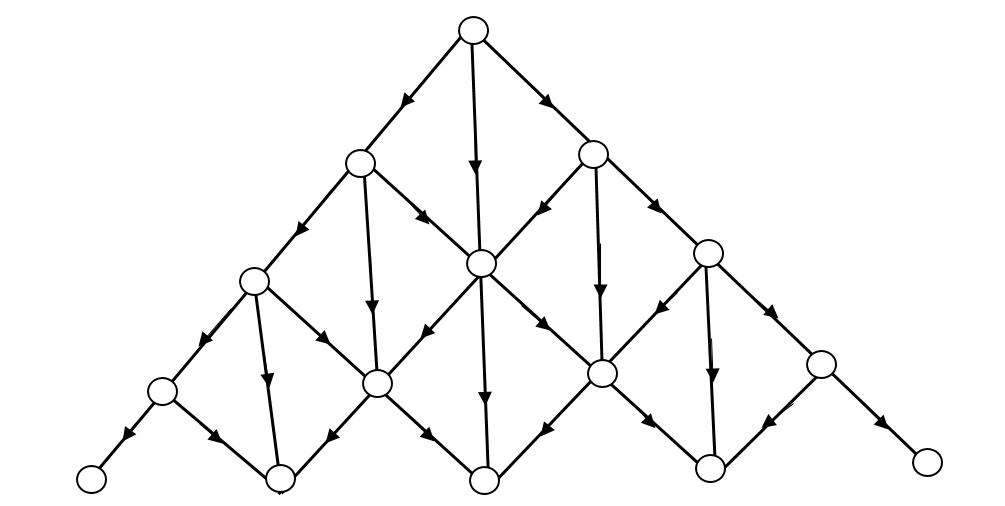
(1+1)d Triangular Lattice

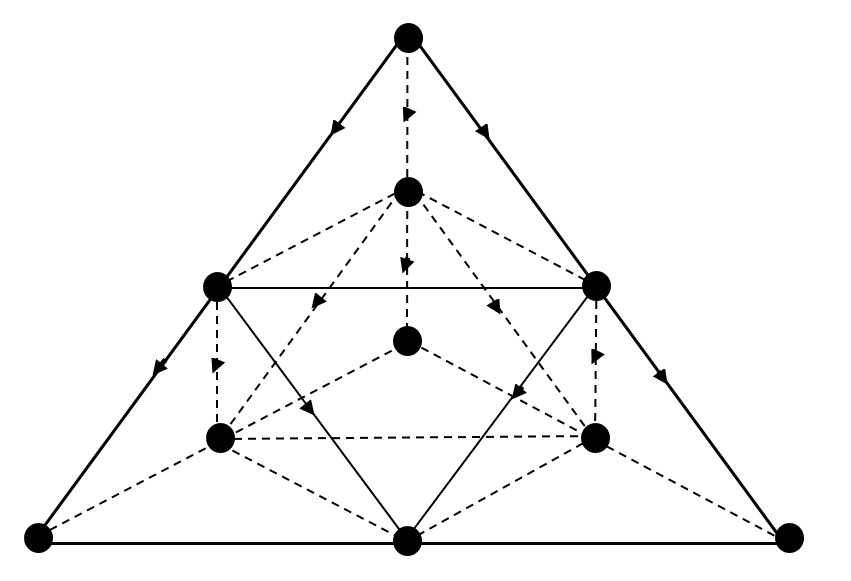
(2+1)d SC Lattice

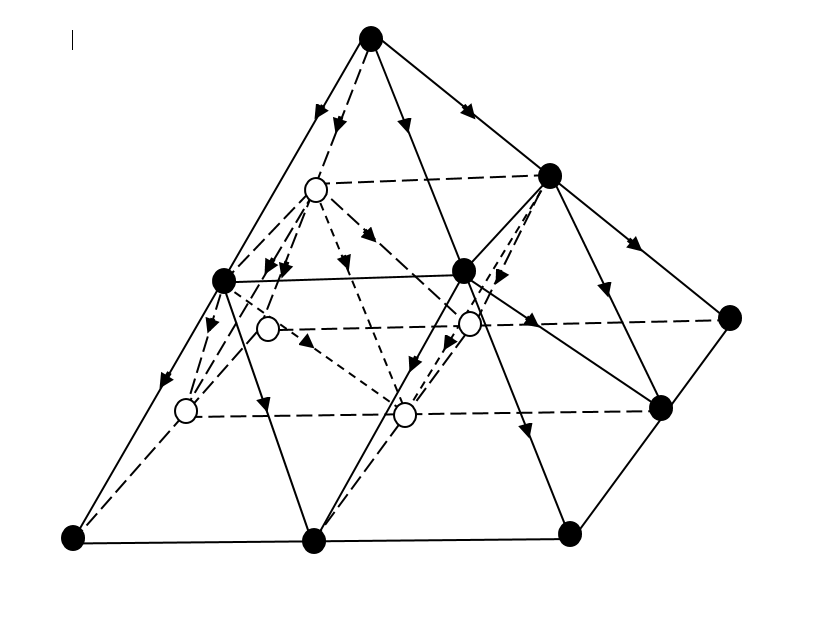
(2+1)d BCC Lattice

Lattice	z	Site percolation threshold	Bond percolation threshold
(1+1)-d honeycomb	1.5	0.8399316(2), 0.839933(5), $= \sqrt{p_c({\mathrm{site}})}$ of (1+1)-d sq.	0.8228569(2), 0.82285680(6)
(1+1)-d kagome	2	0.7369317(2), 0.73693182(4)	0.658(4) 0.6589689(2), 0.65896910(8)
(1+1)-d square, diagonal	2	0.705489(4), 0.705489(4), 0.70548522(4), 0.70548515(20), 0.7054852(3),	0.644701(2), 0.644701(1), 0.644701(1), 0.6447006(10), 0.64470015(5), 0.644700185(5), 0.6447001(2), 0.643(2)
(1+1)-d triangular	3	0.595646(3), 0.5956468(5), 0.5956470(3)	0.478018(2), 0.478025(1), 0.4780250(4) 0.479(3)
(1+1)-d (3^{3},4^{2}) Archimedean	5	0.656(6)	
(2+1)-d simple cubic, diagonal planes	3	0.43531(1), 0.43531411(10)	0.382223(7), 0.38222462(6) 0.383(3)
(2+1)-d square nn (= bcc)	4	0.3445736(3), 0.344575(15) 0.3445740(2)	0.2873383(1), 0.287338(3) 0.28733838(4) 0.287(3)
(2+1)-d fcc			0.199(2))
(3+1)-d hypercubic, diagonal	4	0.3025(10), 0.30339538(5)	0.26835628(5), 0.2682(2)
(3+1)-d cubic, nn	6	0.2081040(4)	0.1774970(5)
(3+1)-d bcc	8	0.160950(30), 0.16096128(3)	0.13237417(2)
(4+1)-d hypercubic, diagonal	5	0.23104686(3)	0.20791816(2), 0.2085(2)
(4+1)-d hypercubic, nn	8	0.1461593(2), 0.1461582(3)	0.1288557(5)
(4+1)-d bcc	16	0.075582(17), 0.0755850(3), 0.07558515(1)	0.063763395(5)
(5+1)-d hypercubic, diagonal	6	0.18651358(2)	0.170615155(5), 0.1714(1)
(5+1)-d hypercubic, nn	10	0.1123373(2)	0.1016796(5)
(5+1)-d hypercubic bcc	32	0.035967(23), 0.035972540(3)	0.0314566318(5)
(6+1)-d hypercubic, diagonal	7	0.15654718(1)	0.145089946(3), 0.1458
(6+1)-d hypercubic, nn	12	0.0913087(2)	0.0841997(14)
(6+1)-d hypercubic bcc	64	0.017333051(2)	0.01565938296(10)
(7+1)-d hypercubic, diagonal	8	0.135004176(10)	0.126387509(3), 0.1270(1)
(7+1)-d hypercubic,nn	14	0.07699336(7)	0.07195(5)
(7+1)-d bcc	128	0.008 432 989(2)	0.007 818 371 82(6)

nn = nearest neighbors. For a (d + 1)-dimensional hypercubic system, the hypercube is in d dimensions and the time direction points to the 2D nearest neighbors.

=== Directed percolation with multiple neighbors ===
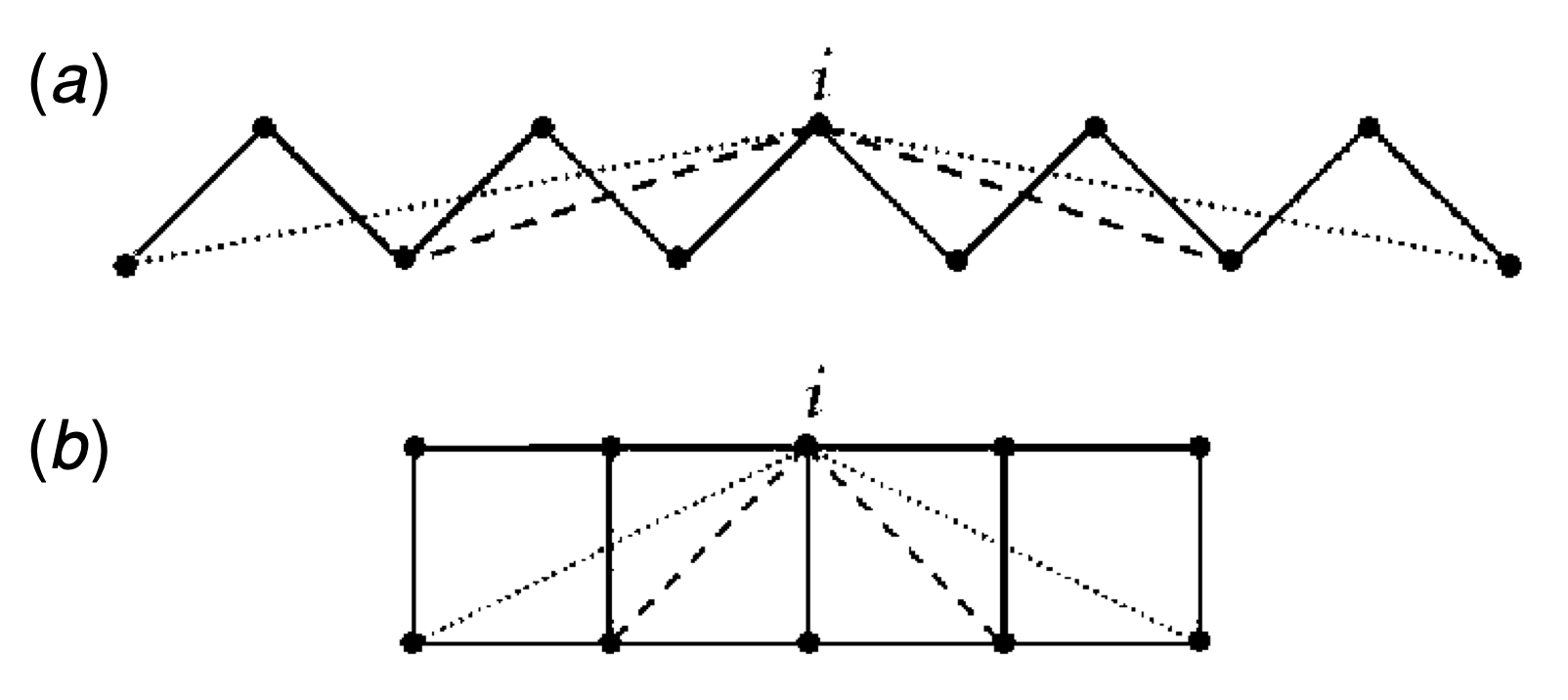
Directed Percolation neighborhoods for extended range. Upper: z = 2, 4, 6; lower: z = 3, 5

(1+1)-d square with z NN, square lattice for z odd, tilted square lattice for z even

Lattice	z	Site percolation threshold	Bond percolation threshold
(1+1)-d square	3		0.4395(3),
(1+1)-d square	5		0.2249(3)
(1+1)-d square	7		0.1470(2)
(1+1)-d square	9		0.1081(2)
(1+1)-d square	11		0.0851(2)
(1+1)-d square	13		0.0701(2)
(1+1)-d tilted sq	2		0.6447(2)
(1+1)-d tilted sq	4		0.3272(2)
(1+1)-d tilted sq	6		0.2121(3)
(1+1)-d tilted sq	8		0.1553(3)
(1+1)-d tilted sq	10		0.1220(2)
(1+1)-d tilted sq	12		0.0999(2)

For large z, p_{c} ~ 1/z

=== Site-Bond Directed Percolation ===
p_{b} = bond threshold

p_{s} = site threshold

Site-bond percolation is equivalent to having different probabilities of connections:

P_{0} = probability that no sites are connected = (1-p_{s}) + p_{s}(1-p_{b})^{2}

P_{2} = probability that exactly one descendant is connected to the upper vertex (two connected together) = p_{s} p_{b} (1-p_{b})

P_{3} = probability that both descendants are connected to the original vertex (all three connected together)= p_{s} p_{b}^{2}

Normalization: P_{0} + 2P_{2} + P_{3} = 1

Lattice	z	p_{s}	p_{b}	P_{0}	P_{2}	P_{3}
(1+1)-d square	3	0.644701	1	0.126237	0.229062	0.415639
		0.7	0.93585	0.148376	0.196529	0.458567
		0.75	0.88565	0.169703	0.166059	0.498178
		0.8	0.84135	0.192304	0.134616	0.538464
		0.85	0.80190	0.216143	0.102242	0.579373
		0.9	0.76645	0.241215	0.068981	0.620825
		0.95	0.73450	0.267336	0.034889	0.662886
		1	0.705489	0.294511	0	0.705489

=== Isotropic/Directed Percolation ===
Here we have a cross between ordinary bond percolation (OP) and directed percolation (DP). On an oriented system such as shown in the figure "(1+1)d Square Lattice" above, we consider the down probability p↓ = p p_{d} and the up probability p↑ = p(1 − p_{d} ), with p representing the average bond occupation probability and p_{d} controlling the anisotropy. When p_{d} = 0 or 1, we have pure DP, while when p_{d} = 1/2 we have the random diode model or essentially OP, with the threshold twice the OP value. For other values of p_{d}, we have a mixture of the two types of percolation. For a given p_{d}, the critical values of p = p_{c} are given below:

Lattice	d	z	p_{d}	p_{c}	p↓	p↑
(1+1)-d DP	2	2	1	0.644700185(5)	0.644700185(5)	0
diagonal square	2	4	0.8	0.768708(1)	0.614966	0.153742
diagonal square	2	4	0.6	0.929668(3)	0.557801	0.371867
2d ordinary perc.	2	4	0.5	1.0	0.5	0.5
(2+1)-d diagonal DP	3	3	1	0.38222462(6)	0.38222462	0
diagonal cubic	3	6	0.8	0.430941(2)	0.34475282	0.086188
diagonal cubic	3	6	0.6	0.481310(2)	0.288786	0.192524
3d Ordinary perc.	3	6	0.5	0.49762364(20)	0.24881182	0.24881182

=== Exact critical manifolds of inhomogeneous systems ===
Inhomogeneous triangular lattice bond percolation

$1 - p_1 - p_2 - p_3 + p_1 p_2 p_3 = 0$

Inhomogeneous honeycomb lattice bond percolation = kagome lattice site percolation

$1 - p_1 p_2 - p_1 p_3 - p_2 p_3+ p_1 p_2 p_3 = 0$

Inhomogeneous (3,12^2) lattice, site percolation

$1 - 3(s_1s_2)^2 + (s_1s_2)^3 = 0,$ or $s_1 s_2 = 1 - 2 \sin(\pi/18)$

Inhomogeneous union-jack lattice, site percolation with probabilities $p_1, p_2, p_3, p_4$

$p_3 = 1 - p_1; \qquad p_4 = 1 - p_2$

Inhomogeneous martini lattice, bond percolation

$1 - (p_1 p_2 r_3 + p_2 p_3 r_1 + p_1 p_3 r_2) - (p_1 p_2 r_1 r_2 + p_1 p_3 r_1 r_3 + p_2 p_3 r_2 r_3) + p_1 p_2 p_3 ( r_1 r_2 + r_1 r_3 + r_2 r_3) + r_1 r_2 r_3 (p_1 p_2 + p_1 p_3 + p_2 p_3) - 2 p_1 p_2 p_3 r_1 r_2 r_3 = 0$

Inhomogeneous martini lattice, site percolation. r = site in the star

$1 - r (p_1 p_2 + p_1 p_3 + p_2 p_3 - p_1 p_2 p_3) = 0$

Inhomogeneous martini-A (3–7) lattice, bond percolation. Left side (top of "A" to bottom): $r_2,\ p_1$. Right side: $r_1, \ p_2$. Cross bond: $\ r_3$.

$1 - p_1 r_2 - p_2 r_1 - p_1 p_2 r_3 - p_1 r_1 r_3 - p_2 r_2 r_3 + p_1 p_2 r_1 r_3 + p_1 p_2 r_2 r_3 + p_1 r_1 r_2 r_3+ p_2 r_1 r_2 r_3 - p_1 p_2 r_1 r_2 r_3 = 0$

Inhomogeneous martini-B (3–5) lattice, bond percolation

Inhomogeneous martini lattice with outside enclosing triangle of bonds, probabilities $y, x, z$ from inside to outside, bond percolation

$1 - 3 z + z^3-(1-z^2) [3 x^2 y (1 + y - y^2)(1 + z) + x^3 y^2 (3 - 2 y)(1 + 2 z) ] = 0$

Inhomogeneous checkerboard lattice, bond percolation

$1 - (p_1 p_2 + p_1 p_3 + p_1 p_4 + p_2 p_3 + p_2 p_4 + p_3 p_4) + p_1 p_2 p_3 + p_1 p_2 p_4 + p_1 p_3 p_4 + p_2 p_3 p_4 = 0$

Inhomogeneous bow-tie lattice, bond percolation

$1 - (p_1 p_2 + p_1 p_3 + p_1 p_4 + p_2 p_3 + p_2 p_4 + p_3 p_4) + p_1 p_2 p_3 + p_1 p_2 p_4 + p_1 p_3 p_4 + p_2 p_3 p_4 - u(1 - p_1 p_2 - p_3 p_4 + p_1 p_2 p_3 p_4) = 0$

where $p_1, p_2, p_3, p_4$ are the four bonds around the square and $u$ is the diagonal bond connecting the vertex between bonds $p_4, p_1$ and $p_2, p_3$.

=== Rigidity percolation ===
Assuming a finite graph with unbending bonds, rigidity percolation refers to a situation where the entire graph is rigid everywhere with respect to shear forces being put on it. Another way to say this is that constraints are sufficient to eliminate all zero-frequency vibrational modes, transforming a mechanically floppy network into one capable of supporting stress.

The Geiringer–Laman theorem gives a combinatorial characterization of generically rigid graphs in 2-dimensional Euclidean space

Generic lattices have bonds of different lengths, and can be made by randomly displacing the sites of a regular lattice.

Numerical results:

Feng, Sen (1984) p_{c} = 0.58, f = 2.4 ± 0.4.

Lemieux, Breton, Tremblay (1985) p_{c}= 0.649, f = 1.4

Sahimi, Goddard (1985) bond triangular p_{c}=0.65

Arababi, Sahimi (1988):. 3d bond cubic elastic network p_{c} = 0.2492,

Roux, Hansen (1988): central force elastic network: p* = 0.642(2), flv = 3.0(4) , glv = 0.97(2)

Jacobs and Thorpe (1996) Bond threshold, triangular lattice: p_{c} = 0.6602(3), p_{c} = 0.69755(3)

Site percolation, triangular lattice p_{c} = 0.69755(3), 0.6975(3)

Correlation-length exponent: ν = 1.16(3), 1.19(1), 1.21(6), 1/ν = 0.850(3)

Arbibi Sahimi (1993): 2d bond tri: p_{c} = 0.641(1), site: p_{c} = 0.713(2).

Moukarzel and Duxbury (1995): 0.6975(3) 𝛼 = -0.48(5) β = 0.175(2)

Fractal dimension d_{f} = 1.86(2). 1.853(5), 1.850(2)

Backbone fractal dimension d_{b} = 1.80(3), 1.78(2)

Duxbury, Jacobs, Thorpe, Moukarzel (1999) Bethe lattice z = 6, p_{c} = 0.656

Chubynsky and Thorpe (2007). 3d: bond fcc, p_{c} = 0.495. bcc: p_{c} = 0.7485

Javerzat (2024) 2d hull fractal dimension: d_{f} =1.355(10).

A fast algorithm for 2D Rigidity Percolation, Javerzat and Notarmuzi. (2026) ν = 1.1694(8), d_{f} = 1.8423(7), p_{c} = 0.6602741(4).

Lu, Song, Shi, Li, Deng (2026) p_{c} = 0.6602778(10), 1/ν = 0.850(3), and d_{f} = 1.850(2),

=== See also ===
- 2D percolation cluster
- Bootstrap percolation
- Directed percolation
- Effective medium approximations
- Epidemic models on lattices
- Graph theory
- Network science
- Percolation
- Percolation critical exponents
- Percolation theory
- Continuum percolation theory
- Random sequential adsorption
- Uniform tilings
