= Ziff–Gulari–Barshad model =

Monte Carlo method for catalytic reaction

The Ziff–Gulari–Barshad (ZGB) model is a simple Monte Carlo method for modeling catalytic reactions of oxidation of carbon monoxide to carbon dioxide on a surface which correctly captures the essential dynamics: phase transitions between two poisoned states (either CO- or O-poisoned) and a steady-state in between. It is named after Robert M. Ziff, Erdogan Gulari, and Yoav Barshad, who published it in 1986.

== Model definition ==
The model consists of three steps:

- Adsorption of the reacting species CO and O_{2}
- The actual reaction step on the surface: CO + O → CO_{2}
- Desorption of the products.

The simplest implementation considers the catalyst as simple square two-dimensional lattice, but one can also consider other kinds of underlying lattices. When a gas-phase molecule touches an empty site, adsorption occurs immediately and the chemical reaction is also instantaneous. Furthermore, one assumes that the composition of the gas phase remains constant.

While these requirements would still allow a large number of models and corresponding behaviors, the two special assumptions of the ZGB model are: (i) CO molecules are adsorbed "standing" with the O touching the surface, and require thus only one free lattice site; (ii) O_{2} molecules are adsorbed "flat" and require thus two adjacent free lattice sites for getting adsorbed.

=== Results and other work ===
When the ratio between O_{2} and CO in the gas phase is increased, the model shows two phase transitions: A continuous one between a O-poisoned and a mixed state, and a discontinuous one between the mixed and a CO-poisoned state. The continuous transition belongs to the universality class of directed percolation. The model was modified several times.
