= Dynamical dimensional reduction =

Theoretical effect in physics

Dynamical dimensional reduction or spontaneous dimensional reduction is the apparent reduction in the number of spacetime dimensions as a function of the distance scale, or conversely the energy scale, with which spacetime is probed. At least within the current level of experimental precision, our universe has three dimensions of space and one of time. However, the idea that the number of dimensions may increase at extremely small length scales was first proposed more than a century ago, and is now fairly commonplace in theoretical physics. Contrary to this, a number of recent results in quantum gravity suggest the opposite behavior, a dynamical reduction of the number of spacetime dimensions at small length scales.

== Evidence for dimensional reduction ==
The phenomenon of dimensional reduction has now been reported in a number of different approaches to quantum gravity. String theory, causal dynamical triangulation (CDT), renormalization group approaches, noncommutative geometry, loop quantum gravity and Horava-Lifshitz gravity all find that the dimensionality of spacetime appears to decrease from approximately 4 on large distance scales to approximately 2 on small distance scales.

The evidence for dimensional reduction has come mainly, although not exclusively, from calculations of the spectral dimension. The spectral dimension is a measure of the effective dimension of a manifold at different resolution scales. Early numerical simulations within the CDT approach to quantum gravity found a spectral dimension of 4.02 ± 0.10 at large distances and 1.80 ± 0.25 at small distances. This result created significant interest in dimensional reduction within the quantum gravity community. A more recent study of the same point in the parameter space of CDT found consistent results, namely 4.05 ± 0.17 at large distances and 1.97 ± 0.27 at small distances.

Currently, there is no consensus on the correct theoretical explanation for the mechanism of dimensional reduction.

== Possible explanations ==
The ubiquity and consistency of dimensional reduction in quantum gravity has driven the search for a theoretical understanding of this phenomenon. Currently, there exist few proposed explanations for the observation of dimensional reduction.

One proposal is that of scale invariance. There is growing evidence that gravity may be nonperturbatively renormalizable as described by the asymptotic safety program, which requires the existence of a non-Gaussian fixed point at high energies towards which the couplings defining the theory flow. At such a fixed point gravity must be scale invariant, and hence Newton's constant must be dimensionless. Only in 2-dimensional spacetime is Newton's constant dimensionless, and so in this scenario going to higher energies and hence flowing towards the fixed point should correspond to the dimensionality of spacetime reducing to the value 2. This explanation is not entirely satisfying as it does not explain why such a fixed point should exist in the first place.

A second possible explanation for dimensional reduction is that of asymptotic silence. General relativity exhibits so-called asymptotic silence in the vicinity of a spacelike singularity, which is the narrowing or focusing of light cones close to the Planck scale leading to a causal decoupling of nearby spacetime points. In this scenario, each point has a preferred spatial direction, and geodesics see a reduced (1 + 1)-dimensional spacetime.

Dimensional reduction implies a deformation or violation of Lorentz invariance and typically predicts an energy dependent speed of light. Given such radical consequences, an alternative proposal is that dimensional reduction should not be taken literally, but should instead be viewed as a hint of new Planck scale physics.
