= Conductivity near the percolation threshold =

Conductivity near the percolation threshold in physics, occurs in a mixture between a dielectric and a metallic component. The conductivity $\sigma$ and the dielectric constant $\epsilon$ of this mixture show a critical behavior if the fraction of the metallic component reaches the percolation threshold.

The behavior of the conductivity near this percolation threshold will show a smooth change over from the conductivity of the dielectric component to the conductivity of the metallic component. This behavior can be described using two critical exponents "s" and "t", whereas the dielectric constant will diverge if the threshold is approached from either side. To include the frequency dependent behavior in electronic components, a resistor-capacitor model (R-C model) is used.

== Geometrical percolation ==
For describing such a mixture of a dielectric and a metallic component we use the model of bond-percolation. On a regular lattice, the bond between two nearest neighbors can either be occupied with probability $p$ or not occupied with probability $1-p$. There exists a critical value $p_c$. For occupation probabilities $p > p_c$ an infinite cluster of the occupied bonds is formed. This value $p_c$ is called the percolation threshold. The region near to this percolation threshold can be described by the two critical exponents $\nu$ and $\beta$ (see Percolation critical exponents).

With these critical exponents we have the correlation length, $\xi$

$\xi(p) \propto (p_c - p)^{- \nu}$

and the percolation probability, P:

$P(p) \propto (p - p_c)^{\beta}$

== Electrical percolation ==
For the description of the electrical percolation, we identify the occupied bonds of the bond-percolation model with the metallic component having a conductivity $\sigma_m$. And the dielectric component with conductivity $\sigma_d$ corresponds to non-occupied bonds. We consider the two following well-known cases of a conductor-insulator mixture and a superconductor–conductor mixture.

=== Conductor-insulator mixture ===
In the case of a conductor-insulator mixture we have $\sigma_d = 0$. This case describes the behaviour, if the percolation threshold is approached from above:

$\sigma_{DC}(p) \propto \sigma_m (p - p_c)^t$

for $p > p_c$

Below the percolation threshold we have no conductivity, because of the perfect insulator and just finite metallic clusters. The exponent t is one of the two critical exponents for electrical percolation.

=== Superconductor–conductor mixture ===
In the other well-known case of a superconductor-conductor mixture we have $\sigma_m = \infty$. This case is useful for the description below the percolation threshold:

$\sigma_{DC}(p) \propto \sigma_d (p_c - p) ^{-s}$

for $p < p_c$

Now, above the percolation threshold the conductivity becomes infinite, because of the infinite superconducting clusters. And also we get the second critical exponent s for the electrical percolation.

=== Conductivity near the percolation threshold ===
In the region around the percolation threshold, the conductivity assumes a scaling form:

$\sigma(p) \propto \sigma_m |\Delta p|^t \Phi_{\pm} \left(h|\Delta p|^{-s-t}\right)$

with $\Delta p \equiv p - p_c$ and $h \equiv \frac{\sigma_d}{\sigma_m}$

At the percolation threshold, the conductivity reaches the value:

$\sigma_{DC}(p_c) \propto \sigma_m \left(\frac{\sigma_d}{\sigma_m}\right)^u$

with $u = \frac{t}{t+s}$

=== Values for the critical exponents ===
In different sources there exists some different values for the critical exponents s, t and u in 3 dimensions:

Values for the critical exponents in 3 dimensions
	Efros et al.	Clerc et al.	Bergman et al.
t	1,60	1,90	2,00
s	1,00	0,73	0,76
u	0,62	0,72	0,72

== Dielectric constant ==
The dielectric constant also shows a critical behavior near the percolation threshold. For the real part of the dielectric constant we have:

$\epsilon_1(\omega=0,p) = \frac{\epsilon_d}{|p-p_c|^s}$

== The R-C model ==
Within the R-C model, the bonds in the percolation model are represented by pure resistors with conductivity $\sigma_m = 1/R$ for the occupied bonds and by perfect capacitors with conductivity $\sigma_d = i C \omega$ (where $\omega$ represents the angular frequency) for the non-occupied bonds. Now the scaling law takes the form:

$\sigma(p, \omega) \propto \frac{1}{R} |\Delta p|^t \Phi_{\pm} \left(\frac{ i \omega}{\omega_0}|\Delta p|^{-(s+t)}\right)$

This scaling law contains a purely imaginary scaling variable and a critical time scale

$\tau^* = \frac{1}{\omega_0}|\Delta p|^{-(s+t)}$

which diverges if the percolation threshold is approached from above as well as from below.

== Conductivity for dense networks ==
For a dense network, the concepts of percolation are not directly applicable and the effective resistance is calculated in terms of geometrical properties of network. Assuming, edge length << electrode spacing and edges to be uniformly distributed, the potential can be considered to drop uniformly from one electrode to another. Sheet resistance of such a random network ($R_{sn}$) can be written in terms of edge (wire) density ($N_E$), resistivity ($\rho$), width ($w$) and thickness ($t$) of edges (wires) as:

$R_{sn} = \frac{\pi}{2}\frac{\rho}{wt\sqrt{N_E}}$

== See also ==
- Percolation theory
