= Percolation surface critical behavior =

Percolation surface critical behavior concerns the influence of surfaces on the critical behavior of percolation.

== Background ==
Percolation is the study of connectivity in random systems, such as electrical conductivity in random conductor/insulator systems, fluid flow in porous media, gelation in polymer systems, etc. At a critical fraction of connectivity or porosity, long-range connectivity can take place, leading to long-range flow. The point where that connectivity takes place is called the percolation threshold, and considerable amount of work has been undertaken in finding those critical values for systems of various geometries, and the mathematical behavior of observables near that point. This leads to the study of critical behavior and the percolation critical exponents. These exponents allow one to describe the behavior as the threshold is approached.

The behavior of the percolating network near a surface will be different from that in the main part of a system, called the "bulk." For example, exact at the percolation threshold, the percolating network in the system is a fractal with large voids and a ramified structure. The surface interrupts this structure, so the percolating cluster is less likely to come in contact to the surface. As an example, consider a lattice system of bond percolation (percolation along the bonds or edges of the lattice). If the lattice is cubic in nature, and $p$ is the probability that a bond is occupied (conducting), then the percolation threshold is known to be $p_c = 0.311608...$. At the surface, the lattice becomes a simple square lattice, where the bond threshold $p_c$ is simply 1/2. Therefore, when the bulk of the system is at its threshold, the surface is way below its threshold, and the only way to have long-range connections along the surface is to have a path that goes from the surface to the bulk, conduction through the fractal percolation network, and then a path back to the surface again. This occurs with a different critical behavior as in the bulk, and is different from the critical behavior of a two-dimensional surface at its threshold.

In the most common model for surface critical behavior in percolation, all bonds are assigned with the same probability $p$, and the behavior is studied at the bulk $p_c$, with a value of 0.311608 in this case. In an other model for surface behavior, the surface bonds are made occupied with a different probability $p_s$, while the bulk is kept at the normal bulk value. When $p^{(s)}$ is increased to a higher value, a new "special" critical point is reached $p^{(s)}_c$, which has a different set of critical exponents.

== Surface phase transitions ==
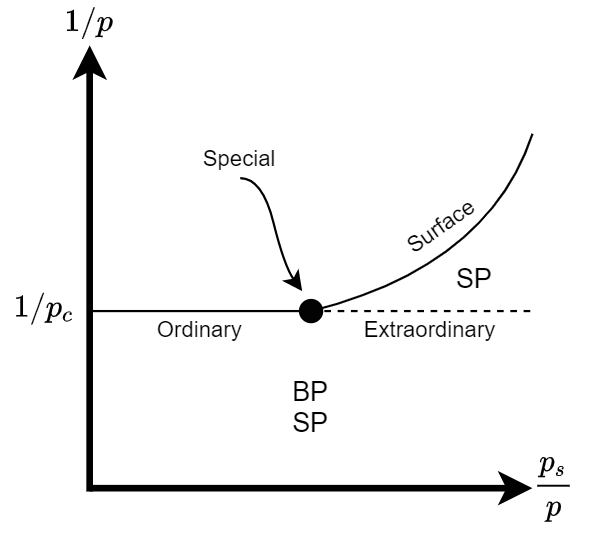
Different surface phase transitions can occur depending on the values of the bulk occupation probability $p$ and the surface occupation probability $p_s$. BP and SP stand for 'bulk percolating' and 'surface percolating' respectively.

In percolation, we can choose to occupy the sites or bonds at the surface with a different probability $p_s$ to the bulk probability $p$. Different surface phase transitions can then occur depending on the values of the bulk occupation probability $p$ and the surface occupation probability $p_s$. The simplest case is the ordinary transition, which occurs when $p$ is at the critical probability for the bulk phase transition. Here both the bulk and the surface start percolating, regardless of the value of $p_s$, since there will typically be a path connecting the surface boundaries through the percolating bulk. Then there is the surface transition, where the bulk probability is below the bulk threshold, but the surface probability is at the percolation threshold for percolation in one lower dimension (i.e. the dimension of the surface). Here the surface undergoes a percolation transition while the bulk remains disconnected. If we enter this region of the phase diagram where the surface is ordered while the bulk is disordered, and then increase the bulk probability, we eventually encounter the extraordinary transition, where the bulk undergoes a percolation transition with the surface already percolating. Finally, there is the special phase transition, which is an isolated point where the phase boundaries for the ordinary, special, and extraordinary transitions meet.

In general the different surface transitions will be in distinct surface universality classes, with different critical exponents. Given an exponent, say $\gamma$, we label the relevant exponent at the ordinary, surface, extraordinary, and special transitions by $\gamma^{(o)}$, $\gamma^{(s)}$, $\gamma^{(e)}$, and $\gamma^{(sp)}$ respectively.

== surface percolation thresholds ==
Lattice	z	Site percolation threshold	Bond percolation threshold
generic triangular	3		

== Surface critical exponents ==
The probability that a surface sites connected to the infinite (percolating) cluster, for an infinite system and $p > p_c$, is given by

$P(p) \sim (p_c - p)^{\beta_s}$

with $\beta_s > \beta$ where $\beta$ is the bulk exponent for the order parameter.

As a function of the time $t$ in an epidemic process (or the chemical distance), we have at $p=p_c$

$P(t,p_c) \sim t^{\delta_s}$

with $\delta_s = \beta_s / \nu_t$, where $\nu_t$ is the bulk dynamical exponent.

$\nu_\parallel$

$\nu_\perp$

Exponent	2d	3d	4d	5d	6d
$\alpha$					
$\beta_s/\nu$		0.970(6), 0.98(2)			
$\nu$					

== Scaling relations ==
The critical exponents the following scaling relations:

$2 X_{h1} = d - 2 + \eta_\parallel$ (Deng and Blöte)

$\gamma_{1,1} = \nu ( 1 - \eta_\parallel)$

$\gamma_{1,1} = 2 \gamma_{1} - \gamma - \nu$

=== See also ===
- Percolation
- Percolation theory
- Percolation critical exponents
