= Electrical resistivities of the elements (data page) =

Chemical data page

== Electrical resistivity ==
T	80 K (−193 °C)	273 K (0 °C)	293 K (20 °C)	298 K (25 °C)	300 K (27 °C)	500 K (227 °C)
3 Li lithium
use	10.0 nΩm	85.3 nΩm	92.8 nΩm	94.7 nΩm	95.5 nΩm	
CRC (10^{−8} Ωm)	1.00	8.53	9.28	9.47	9.55	
LNG (10^{−8} Ωm)			9.28			
WEL (10^{−8} Ωm)	(293 K–298 K) 9.4					
4 Be beryllium
use	0.75 nΩm	30.2 nΩm	35.6 nΩm	37.0 nΩm	37.6 nΩm	99 nΩm
CRC (10^{−8} Ωm)	0.075	3.02	3.56	3.70	3.76	9.9
LNG (10^{−8} Ωm)			3.56			
WEL (10^{−8} Ωm)	(293 K–298 K) 4					
5 B boron
use			1.5×10^{4} Ωm			
LNG (10^{−8} Ωm)			1.5×10^{12}			
WEL (10^{−8} Ωm)	(293 K–298 K) > 10^{12}					
6 C carbon (diamond)
use						
LNG (10^{−8} Ωm)			0.8 [sic]			
6 C carbon (graphite)
use						
LNG (10^{−8} Ωm)			1375			
WEL (10^{−8} Ωm)	(293 K–298 K) about 1000 – direction dependent					
11 Na sodium
use	8.0 nΩm	43.3 nΩm	47.7 nΩm	48.8 nΩm	49.3 nΩm	
CRC (10^{−8} Ωm)	0.80	4.33	4.77	4.88	4.93	
LNG (10^{−8} Ωm)			4.77			
WEL (10^{−8} Ωm)	(293 K–298 K) 4.7					
12 Mg magnesium
use	5.57 nΩm	40.5 nΩm	43.9 nΩm	44.8 nΩm	45.1 nΩm	78.6 nΩm
CRC (10^{−8} Ωm)	0.557	4.05	4.39	4.48	4.51	7.86
LNG (10^{−8} Ωm)			4.39			
WEL (10^{−8} Ωm)	(293 K–298 K) 4.4					
13 Al aluminium
use	2.45 nΩm	24.17 nΩm	26.50 nΩm	27.09 nΩm	27.33 nΩm	49.9 nΩm
CRC (10^{−8} Ωm)	0.245	2.417	2.650	2.709	2.733	4.99
LNG (10^{−8} Ωm)			2.6548			
WEL (10^{−8} Ωm)	(293 K–298 K) 2.65					
14 Si silicon
use						
LNG (10^{−8} Ωm)			10^{5}			
WEL (10^{−8} Ωm)	(293 K–298 K) about 100000					
15 P phosphorus
use						
LNG (10^{−8} Ωm)			(white) 10 [sic]			
WEL (10^{−8} Ωm)	(293 K–298 K) 10					
16 S sulfur
use			(amorphous) 2×10^{15} Ωm			
LNG (10^{−8} Ωm)			(amorphous) 2×10^{23}			
WEL (10^{−8} Ωm)	(293 K–298 K) > 10^{23}					
17 Cl chlorine
use			> 10 Ωm			
LNG (10^{−8} Ωm)			>10^{9}			
WEL (10^{−8} Ωm)	(293 K–298 K) > 10^{10}					
19 K potassium
use	13.4 nΩm	64.9 nΩm	72.0 nΩm	73.9 nΩm	74.7 nΩm	
CRC (10^{−8} Ωm)	1.34	6.49	7.20	7.39	7.47	
LNG (10^{−8} Ωm)			7.2			
WEL (10^{−8} Ωm)	(293 K–298 K) 7					
20 Ca calcium
use	6.5 nΩm	31.1 nΩm	33.6 nΩm	34.2 nΩm	34.5 nΩm	60. nΩm
CRC (10^{−8} Ωm)	0.65	3.11	3.36	3.42	3.45	6.0
LNG (10^{−8} Ωm)			3.36			
WEL (10^{−8} Ωm)	(293 K–298 K) 3.4					
21 Sc scandium
use	(room temperature) (alpha, polycrystalline) calculated 562 nΩm					
CRC (10^{−8} Ωm)	(290 K–300 K) 56.2					
CR2 (10^{−8} Ωm)	(room temperature) (alpha, amorphous) 70.9					
CR2 (10^{−8} Ωm)	(room temperature) (alpha, crystalline) 26.9					
CR2 (10^{−8} Ωm)	(room temperature) (alpha, polycrystalline) calculated from single crystal values 56.2					
LNG (10^{−8} Ωm)			56.2			
WEL (10^{−8} Ωm)	(293 K–298 K) 55					
22 Ti titanium
use		0.39 μΩm	0.420 μΩm			
CRC (10^{−8} Ωm)		39				
LNG (10^{−8} Ωm)			42.0			
WEL (10^{−8} Ωm)	(293 K–298 K) 40					
23 V vanadium
use	24.1 nΩm	181 nΩm	197 nΩm	201 nΩm	202 nΩm	348 nΩm
CRC (10^{−8} Ωm)	2.41	18.1	19.7	20.1	20.2	34.8
LNG (10^{−8} Ωm)			19.7			
WEL (10^{−8} Ωm)	(293 K–298 K) 20					
24 Cr chromium
use		118 nΩm	125 nΩm	126 nΩm	127 nΩm	201 nΩm
CRC (10^{−8} Ωm)		11.8	12.5	12.6	12.7	20.1
LNG (10^{−8} Ωm)			12.5			
WEL (10^{−8} Ωm)	(293 K–298 K) 12.7					
25 Mn manganese
use	1.32 μΩm	1.43 μΩm	1.44 μΩm	1.44 μΩm	1.44 μΩm	1.49 μΩm
CRC (10^{−8} Ωm)	132	143	144	144	144	149
LNG (10^{−8} Ωm)			144			
WEL (10^{−8} Ωm)	(293 K–298 K) 160					
26 Fe iron
use	6.93 nΩm	85.7 nΩm	96.1 nΩm	98.7 nΩm	99.8 nΩm	237 nΩm
CRC (10^{−8} Ωm)	0.693	8.57	9.61	9.87	9.98	23.7
LNG (10^{−8} Ωm)			9.61			
WEL (10^{−8} Ωm)	(293 K–298 K) 9.7					
27 Co cobalt
use		56 nΩm	62.4 nΩm			
CRC (10^{−8} Ωm)		5.6				
LNG (10^{−8} Ωm)			6.24			
WEL (10^{−8} Ωm)	(293 K–298 K) 6					
28 Ni nickel
use	5.45 nΩm	61.6 nΩm	69.3 nΩm	71.2 nΩm	72.0 nΩm	177 nΩm
CRC (10^{−8} Ωm)	0.545	6.16	6.93	7.12	7.20	17.7
LNG (10^{−8} Ωm)			6.93			
WEL (10^{−8} Ωm)	(293 K–298 K) 7					
29 Cu copper
use	2.15 nΩm	15.43 nΩm	16.78 nΩm	17.12 nΩm	17.25 nΩm	30.90 nΩm
CRC (10^{−8} Ωm)	0.215	1.543	1.678	1.712	1.725	3.090
LNG (10^{−8} Ωm)			1.678			
WEL (10^{−8} Ωm)	(293 K–298 K) 1.7					
30 Zn zinc
use	11.5 nΩm	54.6 nΩm	59.0 nΩm	60.1 nΩm	60.6 nΩm	108.2 nΩm
CRC (10^{−8} Ωm)	1.15	5.46	5.90	6.01	6.06	10.82
LNG (10^{−8} Ωm)			5.9			
WEL (10^{−8} Ωm)	(293 K–298 K) 5.9					
31 Ga gallium
use						
CRC (10^{−8} Ωm)		13.6				
LNG (10^{−8} Ωm)	(30 °C) 25.795					
WEL (10^{−8} Ωm)	(293 K–298 K) 14					
32 Ge germanium
use
LNG (10^{−8} Ωm)			53000			
WEL (10^{−8} Ωm)	(293 K–298 K) about 50000					
33 As arsenic
use			333 nΩm			
LNG (10^{−8} Ωm)			33.3			
WEL (10^{−8} Ωm)	(293 K–298 K) 30					
34 Se selenium
use						
LNG (10^{−8} Ωm)		(amorphous) 1.2 [sic]				
WEL (10^{−8} Ωm)	(293 K–298 K) high					
35 Br bromine
use			7.8×10^{10} Ωm			
LNG (10^{−8} Ωm)			7.8×10^{18}			
WEL (10^{−8} Ωm)	(293 K–298 K) > 10^{18}					
37 Rb rubidium
use	26.5 nΩm	115 nΩm	128 nΩm	131 nΩm	133 nΩm	
CRC (10^{−8} Ωm)	2.65	11.5	12.8	13.1	13.3	
LNG (10^{−8} Ωm)			12.8			
WEL (10^{−8} Ωm)	(293 K–298 K) 12					
38 Sr strontium
use	36.4 nΩm	123 nΩm	132 nΩm	134 nΩm	135 nΩm	222 nΩm
CRC (10^{−8} Ωm)	3.64	12.3	13.2	13.4	13.5	22.2
LNG (10^{−8} Ωm)			13.2			
WEL (10^{−8} Ωm)	(293 K–298 K) 13					
39 Y yttrium
use	(room temperature) (alpha, polycrystalline) 596 nΩm					
CRC (10^{−8} Ωm)	(290 K–300 K) 59.6					
CR2 (10^{−8} Ωm)	(room temperature) (alpha, amorphous) 72.5					
CR2 (10^{−8} Ωm)	(room temperature) (alpha, crystalline) 35.5					
CR2 (10^{−8} Ωm)	(room temperature) (alpha, polycrystalline) 59.6					
LNG (10^{−8} Ωm)			59.6			
WEL (10^{−8} Ωm)	(293 K–298 K) 56					
40 Zr zirconium
use	66.4 nΩm	388 nΩm	421 nΩm	429 nΩm	433 nΩm	765 nΩm
CRC (10^{−8} Ωm)	6.64	38.8	42.1	42.9	43.3	76.5
LNG (10^{−8} Ωm)			42.1			
WEL (10^{−8} Ωm)	(293 K–298 K) 42					
41 Nb niobium
use		152 nΩm				
CRC (10^{−8} Ωm)		15.2				
LNG (10^{−8} Ωm)		15.2				
WEL (10^{−8} Ωm)	(293 K–298 K) 15					
42 Mo molybdenum
use	4.82 nΩm	48.5 nΩm	53.4 nΩm	54.7 nΩm	55.2 nΩm	106 nΩm
CRC (10^{−8} Ωm)	0.482	4.85	5.34	5.47	5.52	10.6
LNG (10^{−8} Ωm)			5.34			
WEL (10^{−8} Ωm)	(293 K–298 K) 5					
43 Tc technetium
use						
LNG (10^{−8} Ωm)	(100 °C) 22.6					
WEL (10^{−8} Ωm)	(293 K–298 K) 20					
44 Ru ruthenium
use		71 nΩm				
CRC (10^{−8} Ωm)		7.1				
LNG (10^{−8} Ωm)		7.1				
WEL (10^{−8} Ωm)	(293 K–298 K) 7.1					
45 Rh rhodium
use		43.3 nΩm				
CRC (10^{−8} Ωm)		4.3				
LNG (10^{−8} Ωm)		4.33				
WEL (10^{−8} Ωm)	(293 K–298 K) 4.3					
46 Pd palladium
use	17.5 nΩm	97.8 nΩm	105.4 nΩm	107.3 nΩm	108.0 nΩm	179.4 nΩm
CRC (10^{−8} Ωm)	1.75	9.78	10.54	10.73	10.80	17.94
LNG (10^{−8} Ωm)			10.54			
WEL (10^{−8} Ωm)	(293 K–298 K) 10					
47 Ag silver
use	2.89 nΩm	14.67 nΩm	15.87 nΩm	16.17 nΩm	16.29 nΩm	28.7 nΩm
CRC (10^{−8} Ωm)	0.289	1.467	1.587	1.617	1.629	2.87
LNG (10^{−8} Ωm)			1.587			
WEL (10^{−8} Ωm)	(293 K–298 K) 1.6					
48 Cd cadmium
use		68 nΩm				
use	(22 °C) 72.7 nΩm					
CRC (10^{−8} Ωm)		6.8				
LNG (10^{−8} Ωm)	(22 °C) 7.27					
WEL (10^{−8} Ωm)	(293 K–298 K) 7					
49 In indium
use		0.080 μΩm	83.7 nΩm			
CRC (10^{−8} Ωm)		8.0				
LNG (10^{−8} Ωm)			8.37			
WEL (10^{−8} Ωm)	(293 K–298 K) 8					
50 Sn tin
use		115 nΩm				
CRC (10^{−8} Ωm)		11.5				
LNG (10^{−8} Ωm)		11.5				
WEL (10^{−8} Ωm)	(293 K–298 K) 11					
51 Sb antimony
use		0.39 μΩm	417 nΩm			
CRC (10^{−8} Ωm)		39				
LNG (10^{−8} Ωm)			41.7			
WEL (10^{−8} Ωm)	(293 K–298 K) 40					
52 Te tellurium
use						
LNG (10^{−8} Ωm)			(5.8–33)×10³			
WEL (10^{−8} Ωm)	(293 K–298 K) about 10000					
53 I iodine
use		1.3×10^{7} Ωm				
LNG (10^{−8} Ωm)		1.3×10^{15}				
WEL (10^{−8} Ωm)	(293 K–298 K) > 10^{15}					
55 Cs caesium
use	41.6 nΩm	187 nΩm	205 nΩm	208 nΩm	210 nΩm	
CRC (10^{−8} Ωm)	4.16	18.7	20.5	20.8	21.0	
LNG (10^{−8} Ωm)			20.5			
WEL (10^{−8} Ωm)	(293 K–298 K) 20					
56 Ba barium
use	68.3 nΩm	302 nΩm	332 nΩm	0.340 μΩm	343 nΩm	724 nΩm
CRC (10^{−8} Ωm)	6.83	30.2	33.2	34.0	34.3	72.4
LNG (10^{−8} Ωm)			33.2			
WEL (10^{−8} Ωm)	(293 K–298 K) 35					
57 La lanthanum
use	(room temperature) (alpha, polycrystalline) 615 nΩm					
CRC (10^{−8} Ωm)	(290 K–300 K) 61.5					
CR2 (10^{−8} Ωm)	(room temperature) (alpha, polycrystalline) 61.5					
LNG (10^{−8} Ωm)			61.5			
WEL (10^{−8} Ωm)	(293 K–298 K) 61					
58 Ce cerium (beta, hex)
use	(room temperature) (beta, polycrystalline) 828 nΩm					
CRC (10^{−8} Ωm)	(beta, hex) (290 K–300 K) 82.8					
CR2 (10^{−8} Ωm)	(room temperature) (beta, polycrystalline) 82.8					
LNG (10^{−8} Ωm)			(beta, hex) 82.8			
58 Ce cerium (gamma, cubic)
use	(room temperature) (gamma, polycrystalline) 744 nΩm					
CRC (10^{−8} Ωm)				74.4		
CR2 (10^{−8} Ωm)	(room temperature) (gamma, polycrystalline) 74.4					
WEL (10^{−8} Ωm)	(293 K–298 K) 74					
59 Pr praseodymium
use	(room temperature) (alpha, polycrystalline) 0.700 μΩm					
CRC (10^{−8} Ωm)	(290 K–300 K) 70.0					
CR2 (10^{−8} Ωm)	(room temperature) (alpha, polycrystalline) 70.0					
LNG (10^{−8} Ωm)			70.0			
WEL (10^{−8} Ωm)	(293 K–298 K) 70					
60 Nd neodymium
use	(room temperature) (alpha, polycrystalline) 643 nΩm					
CRC (10^{−8} Ωm)	(290 K–300 K) 64.3					
CR2 (10^{−8} Ωm)	(room temperature) (alpha, polycrystalline) 64.3					
LNG (10^{−8} Ωm)			64.3			
WEL (10^{−8} Ωm)	(293 K–298 K) 64					
61 Pm promethium
use	(room temperature) estimated 0.75 μΩm					
CRC (10^{−8} Ωm)	(290 K–300 K) 75 est.					
CR2 (10^{−8} Ωm)	(room temperature) (alpha, polycrystalline) 75 estimated					
LNG (10^{−8} Ωm)				64.0		
WEL (10^{−8} Ωm)	(293 K–298 K) 75					
62 Sm samarium
use	(room temperature) (alpha, polycrystalline) 0.940 μΩm					
CRC (10^{−8} Ωm)	(290 K–300 K) 94.0					
CR2 (10^{−8} Ωm)	(room temperature) (alpha, polycrystalline) 94.0					
LNG (10^{−8} Ωm)			94.0			
WEL (10^{−8} Ωm)	(293 K–298 K) 94					
63 Eu europium
use	(room temperature) (polycrystalline) 0.900 μΩm					
CRC (10^{−8} Ωm)	(290 K–300 K) 90.0					
CR2 (10^{−8} Ωm)	(room temperature) (polycrystalline) 90.0					
LNG (10^{−8} Ωm)			90.0			
WEL (10^{−8} Ωm)	(293 K–298 K) 90					
64 Gd gadolinium
use	(room temperature) (alpha, polycrystalline) 1.310 μΩm					
CRC (10^{−8} Ωm)	(290 K–300 K) 131					
CR2 (10^{−8} Ωm)	(room temperature) (alpha, amorphous) 135.1					
CR2 (10^{−8} Ωm)	(room temperature) (alpha, crystalline) 121.7					
CR2 (10^{−8} Ωm)	(room temperature) (alpha, polycrystalline) 131.0					
LNG (10^{−8} Ωm)			131			
WEL (10^{−8} Ωm)	(293 K–298 K) 130					
65 Tb terbium
use	(room temperature) (alpha, polycrystalline) 1.150 μΩm					
CRC (10^{−8} Ωm)	(290 K–300 K) 115					
CR2 (10^{−8} Ωm)	(room temperature) (alpha, amorphous) 123.5					
CR2 (10^{−8} Ωm)	(room temperature) (alpha, crystalline) 101.5					
CR2 (10^{−8} Ωm)	(room temperature) (alpha, polycrystalline) 115.0					
LNG (10^{−8} Ωm)			115			
WEL (10^{−8} Ωm)	(293 K–298 K) 120					
66 Dy dysprosium
use	(room temperature) (alpha, polycrystalline) 926 nΩm					
CRC (10^{−8} Ωm)	(290 K–300 K) 92.6					
CR2 (10^{−8} Ωm)	(room temperature) (alpha, amorphous) 111.0					
CR2 (10^{−8} Ωm)	(room temperature) (alpha, crystalline) 76.6					
CR2 (10^{−8} Ωm)	(room temperature) (alpha, polycrystalline) 92.6					
LNG (10^{−8} Ωm)			92.6			
WEL (10^{−8} Ωm)	(293 K–298 K) 91					
67 Ho holmium
use	(room temperature) (polycrystalline) 814 nΩm					
CRC (10^{−8} Ωm)	(290 K–300 K) 81.4					
CR2 (10^{−8} Ωm)	(room temperature) (amorphous) 101.5					
CR2 (10^{−8} Ωm)	(room temperature) (crystalline) 60.5					
CR2 (10^{−8} Ωm)	(room temperature) (polycrystalline) 81.4					
LNG (10^{−8} Ωm)			81.4			
WEL (10^{−8} Ωm)	(293 K–298 K) 94					
68 Er erbium
use	(room temperature) (polycrystalline) 0.860 μΩm					
CRC (10^{−8} Ωm)	(290 K–300 K) 86.0					
CR2 (10^{−8} Ωm)	(room temperature) (amorphous) 94.5					
CR2 (10^{−8} Ωm)	(room temperature) (crystalline) 60.3					
CR2 (10^{−8} Ωm)	(room temperature) (polycrystalline) 86.0					
LNG (10^{−8} Ωm)			86.0			
WEL (10^{−8} Ωm)	(293 K–298 K) 86					
69 Tm thulium
use	(room temperature) (polycrystalline) 676 nΩm					
CRC (10^{−8} Ωm)	(290 K–300 K) 67.6					
CR2 (10^{−8} Ωm)	(room temperature) (amorphous) 88.0					
CR2 (10^{−8} Ωm)	(room temperature) (crystalline) 47.2					
CR2 (10^{−8} Ωm)	(room temperature) (polycrystalline) 67.6					
LNG (10^{−8} Ωm)			67.6			
WEL (10^{−8} Ωm)	(293 K–298 K) 70					
70 Yb ytterbium
use	(room temperature) (beta, polycrystalline) 0.250 μΩm					
CRC (10^{−8} Ωm)	(290 K–300 K) 25.0					
CR2 (10^{−8} Ωm)	(room temperature) (beta, polycrystalline) 25.0					
LNG (10^{−8} Ωm)			25			
WEL (10^{−8} Ωm)	(293 K–298 K) 28					
71 Lu lutetium
use	(room temperature) (polycrystalline) 582 nΩm					
CRC (10^{−8} Ωm)	(290 K–300 K) 58.2					
CR2 (10^{−8} Ωm)	(room temperature) (amorphous) 76.6					
CR2 (10^{−8} Ωm)	(room temperature) (crystalline) 34.7					
CR2 (10^{−8} Ωm)	(room temperature) (polycrystalline) 58.2					
LNG (10^{−8} Ωm)			58.2			
WEL (10^{−8} Ωm)	(293 K–298 K) 56					
72 Hf hafnium
use	67.5 nΩm	304 nΩm	331 nΩm	337 nΩm	0.340 μΩm	631 nΩm
CRC (10^{−8} Ωm)	6.75	30.4	33.1	33.7	34.0	63.1
LNG (10^{−8} Ωm)			33.1			
WEL (10^{−8} Ωm)	(293 K–298 K) 30					
73 Ta tantalum
use	26.2 nΩm	122 nΩm	131 nΩm	134 nΩm	135 nΩm	229 nΩm
CRC (10^{−8} Ωm)	2.62	12.2	13.1	13.4	13.5	22.9
LNG (10^{−8} Ωm)			13.5			
WEL (10^{−8} Ωm)	(293 K–298 K) 13					
74 W tungsten
use	6.06 nΩm	48.2 nΩm	52.8 nΩm	53.9 nΩm	54.4 nΩm	103 nΩm
CRC (10^{−8} Ωm)	0.606	4.82	5.28	5.39	5.44	10.3
LNG (10^{−8} Ωm)			5.28			
WEL (10^{−8} Ωm)	(293 K–298 K) 5					
75 Re rhenium
use		172 nΩm	193 nΩm			
CRC (10^{−8} Ωm)		17.2				
LNG (10^{−8} Ωm)			19.3			
WEL (10^{−8} Ωm)	(293 K–298 K) 18					
76 Os osmium
use		81.2 nΩm				
CRC (10^{−8} Ωm)		8.1				
LNG (10^{−8} Ωm)		8.12				
WEL (10^{−8} Ωm)	(293 K–298 K) 8.1					
77 Ir iridium
use		47 nΩm	47.1 nΩm			
CRC (10^{−8} Ωm)		4.7				
LNG (10^{−8} Ωm)			4.71			
WEL (10^{−8} Ωm)	(293 K–298 K) 4.7					
78 Pt platinum
use	19.22 nΩm	96 nΩm	105 nΩm	107 nΩm	108 nΩm	183 nΩm
CRC (10^{−8} Ωm)	1.922	9.6	10.5	10.7	10.8	18.3
LNG (10^{−8} Ωm)			10.6			
WEL (10^{−8} Ωm)	(293 K–298 K) 10.6					
79 Au gold
use	4.81 nΩm	20.51 nΩm	22.14 nΩm	22.55 nΩm	22.71 nΩm	39.7 nΩm
CRC (10^{−8} Ωm)	0.481	2.051	2.214	2.255	2.271	3.97
LNG (10^{−8} Ωm)			2.214			
WEL (10^{−8} Ωm)	(293 K–298 K) 2.2					
80 Hg mercury
use				961 nΩm		
CRC (10^{−8} Ωm)				96.1		
LNG (10^{−8} Ωm)	(solid) 21					
LNG (10^{−8} Ωm)	(liquid) 95.8					
WEL (10^{−8} Ωm)	(293 K–298 K) 96					
81 Tl thallium
use		0.15 μΩm	0.18 μΩm			
CRC (10^{−8} Ωm)		15				
LNG (10^{−8} Ωm)			18			
WEL (10^{−8} Ωm)	(293 K–298 K) 15					
82 Pb lead
use	49 nΩm	192 nΩm	208 nΩm	211 nΩm	213 nΩm	383 nΩm
CRC (10^{−8} Ωm)	4.9	19.2	20.8	21.1	21.3	38.3
LNG (10^{−8} Ωm)			20.8			
WEL (10^{−8} Ωm)	(293 K–298 K) 21					
83 Bi bismuth
use		1.07 μΩm	1.29 μΩm			
CRC (10^{−8} Ωm)		107				
LNG (10^{−8} Ωm)			129			
WEL (10^{−8} Ωm)	(293 K–298 K) 130					
84 Po polonium
use		(alpha) 0.40 μΩm				
CRC (10^{−8} Ωm)		40				
LNG (10^{−8} Ωm)		(alpha) 40.0				
WEL (10^{−8} Ωm)	(293 K–298 K) 43					
88 Ra radium
use			1 μΩm			
LNG (10^{−8} Ωm)			100			
WEL (10^{−8} Ωm)	(293 K–298 K) 100					
90 Th thorium
use		147 nΩm				
use	(22 °C) 15.4					
CRC (10^{−8} Ωm)		14.7				
LNG (10^{−8} Ωm)	(22 °C) 15.4					
WEL (10^{−8} Ωm)	(293 K–298 K) 15					
91 Pa protactinium
use		177 nΩm				
use	(22 °C) 19.1					
CRC (10^{−8} Ωm)		17.7				
LNG (10^{−8} Ωm)	(22 °C) 19.1					
WEL (10^{−8} Ωm)	(293 K–298 K) 18					
92 U uranium
use		0.280 μΩm				
CRC (10^{−8} Ωm)		28				
LNG (10^{−8} Ωm)		28.0				
WEL (10^{−8} Ωm)	(293 K–298 K) 28					
93 Np neptunium
use	(22 °C) 1.220 μΩm					
LNG (10^{−8} Ωm)	(22 °C) 122.0					
WEL (10^{−8} Ωm)	(293 K–298 K) 120					
94 Pu plutonium
use		1.460 μΩm				
LNG (10^{−8} Ωm)		146.0				
WEL (10^{−8} Ωm)	(293 K–298 K) 150					
95 Am americium
use	(room temperature) 689 nΩm					
96 Cm curium
use	(room temperature) 1250 nΩm					
T	80 K (−193 °C)	273 K (0 °C)	293 K (20 °C)	298 K (25 °C)	300 K (27 °C)	500 K (227 °C)
