= Spectral dimension =

Type of geometric quantity

The spectral dimension is a real-valued quantity that characterizes a spacetime geometry and topology. It characterizes a spread into space over time, e.g. an ink drop diffusing in a water glass or the evolution of a pandemic in a population. Its definition is as follows: if a phenomenon spreads as $t^n$, with $t$ the time, then the spectral dimension is $2n$. The spectral dimension depends on the topology of the space, e.g., the distribution of neighbors in a population, and the diffusion rate.

In physics, the concept of spectral dimension is used, among other things, in quantum gravity, percolation theory, superstring theory, or quantum field theory.

== Examples ==
The diffusion of ink in an isotropic homogeneous medium like still water evolves as $t^{3/2}$, giving a spectral dimension of 3.

Ink in a 2D Sierpiński triangle diffuses following a more complicated path and thus more slowly, as $t^{0.6826}$, giving a spectral dimension of 1.3652.

== See also ==
- Dimension
- Fractal dimension
- Hausdorff dimension
