= Dirac Medal (ICTP) =

Prize awarded by the International Centre for Theoretical Physics

- Awarded for: Outstanding contributions to theoretical physics
- Country: Italy
- Presented by: International Centre for Theoretical Physics
- First award: 1985
- Website: www.ictp.it/about-ictp/dirac-medal

The Dirac Medal of the ICTP is given each year by the International Centre for Theoretical Physics (ICTP) in honour of physicist Paul Dirac. The award, announced each year on 8 August (Dirac's birthday), was first awarded in 1985.

An international committee of distinguished scientists selects the winners from a list of nominated candidates. The Committee invites nominations from scientists working in the fields of theoretical physics or mathematics.

The Dirac Medal of the ICTP is not awarded to Nobel Laureates, Fields Medalists, or Wolf Prize winners. However, several Dirac Medallists have subsequently won one of these awards.

The medallists receive a prize of US$5,000.

== Recipients ==
Year	Laureates	For
1985	Edward Witten	"path-opening contributions to the physics of elementary particles and gravity, to the search for unification, and to the imaginative pursuit of the implications for cosmology."
1985	Yakov Zel'dovich	"far-ranging contributions to relativistic astrophysics, particularly in theories of compact objects and cosmic evolution."
1986	Alexander Polyakov	"being among the first to emphasize the importance of scale invariance in quantum field theory, particularly in connection with the theory of critical phenomena."
1986	Yoichiro Nambu	"being one of the first physicists to formulate the idea of spontaneous symmetry breaking and in particular, chiral symmetry breaking in relativistic particle physics. His contributions to the quark model in the 1960s and, later, his geometrical formulation of the dual resonance models as the dynamics of a relativistic string theory are of fundamental importance."
1987	Bruno Zumino	"fundamental contributions to the study of chiral anomalies in gauge theories with fermions. Also in collaboration with Prof. [Julius] Wess, he proposed the first renormalizable Lagrangian field theories to realize supersymmetry in 4-dimensional space-time. With Prof. Stanley Deser he constructed one of the first supergravity theories in four dimensions. In addition to this important early work, he has been a leader in the application of modern geometrical ideas in field theory."
1987	Bryce DeWitt	"his fundamental contributions to the study of classical and quantum gravity and non-Abelian gauge theory. His pioneering work with quantum, effective action underlies much of the modern formalism. Particularly important are the background field method which he invented, and the methodology of ghost loops in gauge theory, which he did much to develop."
1988	David J. Gross	"his fundamental contributions to the understanding of nuclear forces at short distances and to the theory of superstrings. Together with F. Wilczek and, independently, H. D. Politzer and G. H. 't Hooft, he discovered the mechanism of asymptotic freedom in non-Abelian gauge theories. This discovery, which accounts for the phenomenon of scaling in deep inelastic interactions, was central to the development of quantum chromodynamics as a viable model for the nuclear force. His invention, together with [Jeffrey A.] Harvey, [Emil] Martinec and [Ryan] Rohm, of the heterotic superstring model enlarges the theoretical understanding of string theory and has provided a great stimulus to research in this subject."
1988	Efim S. Fradkin	"his many fruitful contributions to the development of quantum field theory and statistics. Among these are his early work on functional methods including his formal solution to the Schwinger-Dyson equations for the Green's functions of interacting systems. This result has become a standard part of modern quantum field theory. Independently of [Yasushi] Takahashi he discovered the generalized Ward identities for electrodynamics. These identities and their generalizations for non-Abelian gauge theories are basic to the understanding of local symmetries."
1989	John H. Schwarz	"their basic contributions to the development of superstring theory. Most significant was their discovery that chiral gauge anomalies are absent for a class of ten dimensional superstring theories. This provided a strong indication that superstring theory with a specific gauge symmetry may provide a consistent unified quantum theory of the fundamental forces including gravity. It led to an explosion of interest in string theory which has already spurred remarkable advances both in mathematical physics and in pure mathematics."
1989	Michael Green	
1990	Ludwig Faddeev	"researches in the area of quantum field theory and mathematical physics. His name is well known in theoretical physics in connection with the Three Body System (Faddeev's equation). He made decisive contributions to the quantization of the Yang-Mills and gravitational field. The Faddeev-Popov covariant prescription of quantization of non-Abelian gauge theories discovered in 1966-67 has many essential applications including quantum effects in the Glashow-Salam-Weinberg model of electroweak interactions and in quantum chromodynamics."
1990	Sidney R. Coleman	"his contributions to quantum field theory and particle physics. His work on quantum field theories has greatly clarified their structure. This includes the classification of all possible bosonic symmetries of S-matrix (with J. Mandula) and the study of some fundamental properties of two-dimensional quantum field theories including, in particular, the absence of symmetry breaking and aspects of boson-fermion equivalence."
1991	Jeffrey Goldstone	"his fundamental clarification of spontaneous symmetry violation in relativistic quantum field theory."
1991	Stanley Mandelstam	"his contributions to the development of theoretical physics."
1992	Nikolai Bogoliubov	"many outstanding contributions in physics and mathematics."
1992	Yakov G. Sinai	"many outstanding contributions in physics and mathematics."
1993	Daniel Z. Freedman	"for their discovery of supergravity theory in 1976 and their major contributions in the subsequent developments of the theory. Their discovery led to an explosion of interest in quantum gravity and it transformed the subject, playing a significant role in very important developments in string theory as well as Kaluza-Klein theory."
1993	Peter van Nieuwenhuizen	"for their discovery of supergravity theory in 1976 and their major contributions in the subsequent developments of the theory. Their discovery led to an explosion of interest in quantum gravity and it transformed the subject, playing a significant role in very important developments in string theory as well as Kaluza-Klein theory."
1993	Sergio Ferrara	"for their discovery of supergravity theory in 1976 and their major contributions in the subsequent developments of the theory. Their discovery led to an explosion of interest in quantum gravity and it transformed the subject, playing a significant role in very important developments in string theory as well as Kaluza-Klein theory."
1994	Frank Wilczek	"his contributions to the development of theoretical physics. In 1973 he was one of the discoverers of the phenomenon of "asymptotic freedom" in non-Abelian gauge theories. This fundamental observation - that the effective interaction at short distances becomes weak, even in strongly interacting systems - led to the development of a realistic model for hadron physics."
1995	Michael Berry	"for his discovery of the non-integrable phase that arises in adiabatic processes in quantum theory. This effect was first detected in 1986 in an optics experiment by [Akira] Tomita and [Raymond] Chiao in which the rotation of the polarization plane of a wave propagating in a twisted optical fibre was interpreted as a Berry phase."
1996	Martinus J.G. Veltman	"his pioneering investigations on the renormalizability of gauge theories and consequently, his analysis of the sensitivity of radiative corrections to both the mass differences in fermion doublets and the Higgs particle mass. These calculations provided the basic prediction in the search for the top quark mass."
1996	Tullio Regge	"crucial contributions in theoretical and mathematical physics starting with his seminal investigation of the asymptotic behavior of potential scattering processes through the analytic continuation of the angular momentum to the complex plane. The so-called Regge trajectories have helped in the classification of particles and resonances by grouping together entities with different spin. The so-called Regge behavior was, and still is, an important ingredient in the construction of string theories."
1997	David Olive	"their farsighted and highly influential contributions to theoretical physics, over an extended period. Goddard and Olive have contributed many crucial insights that shaped our emerging understanding of string theory and have also had a far-reaching impact on our understanding of four-dimensional field theory."
1997	Peter Goddard	"their farsighted and highly influential contributions to theoretical physics, over an extended period. Goddard and Olive have contributed many crucial insights that shaped our emerging understanding of string theory and have also had a far-reaching impact on our understanding of four-dimensional field theory."
1998	Roman Jackiw	"use of quantum field theory to illuminate physical problems. The derivation by Adler (and, independently, Weisberger) of a sum rule for pion-nucleon scattering marked a breakthrough in our understanding of the currents and broken symmetries of the strong interactions. Jackiw made a major contribution to field theories relevant to condensed matter physics in his discovery (with [Claudio] Rebbi) of fractional charge and spin in these theories. The paths of Adler and Jackiw (with [John Stewart] Bell) crossed in what may be their most important discovery: the celebrated triangle anomaly, one of the most profound examples of the relevance of quantum field theory to the real world."
1998	Stephen L. Adler	
1999	Giorgio Parisi	"his original and deep contributions to many areas of physics ranging from the study of scaling violations in deep inelastic processes (Altarelli-Parisi equations), the proposal of the superconductor's flux confinement model as a mechanism for quark confinement, the use of supersymmetry in statistical classical systems, the introduction of multifractals in turbulence, the stochastic differential equation for growth models for random aggregation (the Kardar-Parisi-Zhang model) and his groundbreaking analysis of the replica method that has permitted an important breakthrough in our understanding of glassy systems and has proved to be instrumental in the whole subject of Disordered Systems."
2000	Helen Quinn	"pioneering contributions to the quest for a unified theory of quarks and leptons and of the strong, weak, and electromagnetic interactions."
2000	Howard Georgi	"pioneering contributions to the quest for a unified theory of quarks and leptons and of the strong, weak, and electromagnetic interactions."
2000	Jogesh Pati	"pioneering contributions to the quest for a unified theory of quarks and leptons and of the strong, weak, and electromagnetic interactions."
2001	John Hopfield	“important contributions in an impressively broad spectrum of scientific subjects. His special and rare gift is his ability to cross the inter-disciplinary boundary to discover new questions and propose answers that uncover the conceptual structure behind the experimental facts"
2002	Alan Guth	"the development of the concept of inflation in cosmology. Although the history of the very early universe has not been firmly established, the idea of inflation has already had notable observational successes, and it has become the paradigm for fundamental studies in cosmology."
2002	Andrei Linde	"the development of the concept of inflation in cosmology. Although the history of the very early universe has not been firmly established, the idea of inflation has already had notable observational successes, and it has become the paradigm for fundamental studies in cosmology."
2002	Paul Steinhardt	"the development of the concept of inflation in cosmology. Although the history of the very early universe has not been firmly established, the idea of inflation has already had notable observational successes, and it has become the paradigm for fundamental studies in cosmology."
2003	Robert Kraichnan	"their distinct contributions to the theory of turbulence, particularly the exact results and the prediction of inverse cascades, and for identifying classes of turbulence problems for which in-depth understanding has been achieved."
2003	Vladimir E. Zakharov	"their distinct contributions to the theory of turbulence, particularly the exact results and the prediction of inverse cascades, and for identifying classes of turbulence problems for which in-depth understanding has been achieved."
2004	Curtis Callan	"theoretical developments of the late 60's and early 70's that led to the use of deep inelastic scattering for the elucidation of the nature of the strong interactions."
2004	James Bjorken	"theoretical developments of the late 60's and early 70's that led to the use of deep inelastic scattering for the elucidation of the nature of the strong interactions."
2005	Patrick A. Lee	"his work on weak localization and interaction effects, is being recognized for his pioneering contributions to our understanding of disordered and strongly interacting many-body systems."
2005	Sam Edwards	"his fundamental contributions to polymer physics, spin glass theory and the physics of granular matter."
2006	Peter Zoller	"innovative and prolific work in atomic physics, including seminal work proposing methods to use trapped ions for quantum computing and describing how to realize the Bose-Hubbard model and associated phase transitions in ultracold gases."
2007	John Iliopoulos	"their work on the physics of the charm quark, a major contribution to the birth of the Standard Model, the modern theory of Elementary Particles."
2007	Luciano Maiani	"their work on the physics of the charm quark, a major contribution to the birth of the Standard Model, the modern theory of Elementary Particles."
2008	Joe Polchinski	"for their fundamental contributions to superstring theory. Their studies range from early work on orbifold compactifications, physics and mathematics of mirror symmetry, D-branes and black hole physics, as well as gauge theory-gravity correspondence. Their contributions in uncovering the strong-weak dualities between seemingly different string theories have enabled us to learn about regimes of quantum field theory which are not accessible to perturbative analysis."
2008	Juan Maldacena	"for their fundamental contributions to superstring theory. Their studies range from early work on orbifold compactifications, physics and mathematics of mirror symmetry, D-branes and black hole physics, as well as gauge theory-gravity correspondence. Their contributions in uncovering the strong-weak dualities between seemingly different string theories have enabled us to learn about regimes of quantum field theory which are not accessible to perturbative analysis."
2008	Cumrun Vafa	"for their fundamental contributions to superstring theory. Their studies range from early work on orbifold compactifications, physics and mathematics of mirror symmetry, D-branes and black hole physics, as well as gauge theory-gravity correspondence. Their contributions in uncovering the strong-weak dualities between seemingly different string theories have enabled us to learn about regimes of quantum field theory which are not accessible to perturbative analysis."
2009	Roberto Car	"developing the ab initio simulation method in which they combined, elegantly and imaginatively, the quantum mechanical density functional method for the calculation of the electronic properties of matter with molecular dynamics methods for the Newtonian simulation of atomic motions."
2009	Michele Parrinello	"developing the ab initio simulation method in which they combined, elegantly and imaginatively, the quantum mechanical density functional method for the calculation of the electronic properties of matter with molecular dynamics methods for the Newtonian simulation of atomic motions."
2010	Nicola Cabibbo	"their fundamental contributions to the understanding of weak interactions and other aspects of theoretical physics."
2010	George Sudarshan	"their fundamental contributions to the understanding of weak interactions and other aspects of theoretical physics."
2011	Édouard Brézin	"their independent pioneering work on field theoretical methods to the study of critical phenomena and phase transitions; in particular for their significant contributions to conformal field theories and integrable systems."
2011	John Cardy	"their independent pioneering work on field theoretical methods to the study of critical phenomena and phase transitions; in particular for their significant contributions to conformal field theories and integrable systems."
2011	Alexander Zamolodchikov	"their independent pioneering work on field theoretical methods to the study of critical phenomena and phase transitions; in particular for their significant contributions to conformal field theories and integrable systems."
2012	Duncan Haldane	"their many important contributions to condensed matter physics, including their independent work preparing and opening the field of two and three dimensional topological insulators."
2012	Charles L. Kane	"their many important contributions to condensed matter physics, including their independent work preparing and opening the field of two and three dimensional topological insulators."
2012	Shoucheng Zhang	"their many important contributions to condensed matter physics, including their independent work preparing and opening the field of two and three dimensional topological insulators."
2013	Tom W. B. Kibble	"their independent, ground-breaking work throughout their careers elucidating many aspects of fundamental physics, cosmology and astrophysics."
2013	Jim Peebles	"their independent, ground-breaking work throughout their careers elucidating many aspects of fundamental physics, cosmology and astrophysics."
2013	Martin John Rees	"their independent, ground-breaking work throughout their careers elucidating many aspects of fundamental physics, cosmology and astrophysics."
2014	Ashoke Sen	"crucial contributions to the origin, development and further understanding of string theory."
2014	Andrew Strominger	"crucial contributions to the origin, development and further understanding of string theory."
2014	Gabriele Veneziano	"crucial contributions to the origin, development and further understanding of string theory."
2015	Alexei Kitaev	"their interdisciplinary contributions which introduced concepts of conformal field theory and non-abelian quasiparticle statistics in condensed matter systems and applications of these ideas to quantum computation."
2015	Greg Moore	"their interdisciplinary contributions which introduced concepts of conformal field theory and non-abelian quasiparticle statistics in condensed matter systems and applications of these ideas to quantum computation."
2015	Nicholas Read	"their interdisciplinary contributions which introduced concepts of conformal field theory and non-abelian quasiparticle statistics in condensed matter systems and applications of these ideas to quantum computation."
2016	Nathan Seiberg	"their important contributions to a better understanding of field theories in the non-perturbative regime and in particular for exact results in supersymmetric field theories."
2016	Mikhail Shifman	"their important contributions to a better understanding of field theories in the non-perturbative regime and in particular for exact results in supersymmetric field theories."
2016	Arkady Vainshtein	"their important contributions to a better understanding of field theories in the non-perturbative regime and in particular for exact results in supersymmetric field theories."
2017	Charles H. Bennett	"their pioneering work in applying the fundamental concepts of quantum mechanics to solving basic problems in computation and communication and therefore bringing together the fields of quantum mechanics, computer science and information."
2017	David Deutsch	"their pioneering work in applying the fundamental concepts of quantum mechanics to solving basic problems in computation and communication and therefore bringing together the fields of quantum mechanics, computer science and information."
2017	Peter W. Shor	"their pioneering work in applying the fundamental concepts of quantum mechanics to solving basic problems in computation and communication and therefore bringing together the fields of quantum mechanics, computer science and information."
2018	Subir Sachdev	"their independent contributions towards understanding novel phases in strongly interacting many-body systems, introducing original transdisciplinary techniques."
2018	Dam Thanh Son	"their independent contributions towards understanding novel phases in strongly interacting many-body systems, introducing original transdisciplinary techniques."
2018	Xiao-Gang Wen	"their independent contributions towards understanding novel phases in strongly interacting many-body systems, introducing original transdisciplinary techniques."
2019	Viatcheslav Mukhanov	"for their outstanding contributions to the physics of the Cosmic Microwave Background (CMB) with experimentally tested implications that have helped to transform cosmology into a precision scientific discipline by combining microscopic physics with the large scale structure of the universe."
2019	Alexei Starobinsky	"for their outstanding contributions to the physics of the Cosmic Microwave Background (CMB) with experimentally tested implications that have helped to transform cosmology into a precision scientific discipline by combining microscopic physics with the large scale structure of the universe."
2019	Rashid Sunyaev	"for their outstanding contributions to the physics of the Cosmic Microwave Background (CMB) with experimentally tested implications that have helped to transform cosmology into a precision scientific discipline by combining microscopic physics with the large scale structure of the universe."
2020	André Neveu	"their pioneering contributions to the inception and formulation of string theory which introduced new Bosonic and Fermionic symmetries into physics."
2020	Pierre Ramond	"their pioneering contributions to the inception and formulation of string theory which introduced new Bosonic and Fermionic symmetries into physics."
2020	Miguel Virasoro	"their pioneering contributions to the inception and formulation of string theory which introduced new Bosonic and Fermionic symmetries into physics."
2021	Alessandra Buonanno	"establishing the predicted properties of gravitational waves in the curvature of spacetime produced when stars or black holes spiral together and merge."
2021	Thibault Damour	"establishing the predicted properties of gravitational waves in the curvature of spacetime produced when stars or black holes spiral together and merge."
2021	Frans Pretorius	"establishing the predicted properties of gravitational waves in the curvature of spacetime produced when stars or black holes spiral together and merge."
2021	Saul Teukolsky	"establishing the predicted properties of gravitational waves in the curvature of spacetime produced when stars or black holes spiral together and merge."
2022	Joel L. Lebowitz	"groundbreaking and mathematically rigorous contributions to the understanding of the statistical mechanics of classical and quantum physical systems."
2022	Elliott H. Lieb	"groundbreaking and mathematically rigorous contributions to the understanding of the statistical mechanics of classical and quantum physical systems."
2022	David P. Ruelle	"groundbreaking and mathematically rigorous contributions to the understanding of the statistical mechanics of classical and quantum physical systems."
2023	Jeffrey Harvey	"their pioneering contributions to perturbative and non-perturbative string theory and quantum gravity, in particular, to the aspects related to anomalies, duality, black holes and holography."
2023	Igor Klebanov	"their pioneering contributions to perturbative and non-perturbative string theory and quantum gravity, in particular, to the aspects related to anomalies, duality, black holes and holography."
2023	Stephen Shenker	"their pioneering contributions to perturbative and non-perturbative string theory and quantum gravity, in particular, to the aspects related to anomalies, duality, black holes and holography."
2023	Leonard Susskind	"their pioneering contributions to perturbative and non-perturbative string theory and quantum gravity, in particular, to the aspects related to anomalies, duality, black holes and holography."
2024	Horacio Casini	"their insights on quantum entropy in quantum gravity and quantum field theories".
2024	Marina Huerta	"their insights on quantum entropy in quantum gravity and quantum field theories".
2024	Shinsei Ryu	"their insights on quantum entropy in quantum gravity and quantum field theories".
2024	Tadashi Takayanagi	"their insights on quantum entropy in quantum gravity and quantum field theories".
2025	Gary Gibbons	“their landmark contributions which have significantly shaped the study of general relativity across many generations. Their work collectively has laid the conceptual and technical foundations of our understanding of gravity, at both the classical and quantum levels.”
2025	Gary Horowitz	“their landmark contributions which have significantly shaped the study of general relativity across many generations. Their work collectively has laid the conceptual and technical foundations of our understanding of gravity, at both the classical and quantum levels.”
2025	Roy Kerr	“their landmark contributions which have significantly shaped the study of general relativity across many generations. Their work collectively has laid the conceptual and technical foundations of our understanding of gravity, at both the classical and quantum levels.”
2025	Robert Wald	“their landmark contributions which have significantly shaped the study of general relativity across many generations. Their work collectively has laid the conceptual and technical foundations of our understanding of gravity, at both the classical and quantum levels.”
2026	Bernard Derrida	“For their pioneering contributions to equilibrium statistical mechanics and for extending its concepts and methods into non-equilibrium statistical mechanics, optimization problems, theoretical neuroscience, and, finally, artificial intelligence.”
2026	Deepak Dhar	“For their pioneering contributions to equilibrium statistical mechanics and for extending its concepts and methods into non-equilibrium statistical mechanics, optimization problems, theoretical neuroscience, and, finally, artificial intelligence.”
2026	Marc Mézard	“For their pioneering contributions to equilibrium statistical mechanics and for extending its concepts and methods into non-equilibrium statistical mechanics, optimization problems, theoretical neuroscience, and, finally, artificial intelligence.”
2026	Haim Sompolinsky	“For their pioneering contributions to equilibrium statistical mechanics and for extending its concepts and methods into non-equilibrium statistical mechanics, optimization problems, theoretical neuroscience, and, finally, artificial intelligence.”

== See also ==
- List of physics awards
- List of awards named after people
