= Sam Edwards (physicist) =

Welsh physicist (1928–2015)

Sir Sam Edwards FRS FLSW
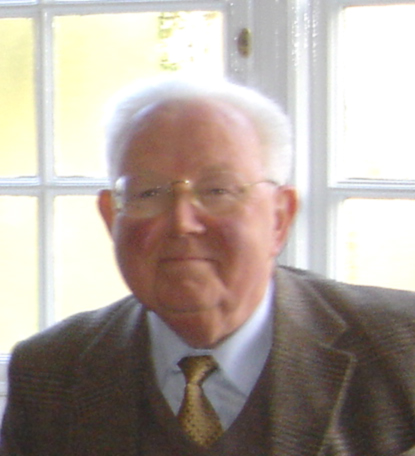
- Born: 1 February 1928; Swansea, Wales
- Died: 7 May 2015 (aged 87); Cambridge, England
- Education: University of Cambridge; Harvard University
- Known for: Path integral formulation Polymer physics Spin glass Granular material
- Awards: Maxwell Medal and Prize (1974); Davy Medal (1984); Boltzmann medal (1995); Royal Medal (2001); Dirac Medal (2005)
- Scientific career
- Fields: Physics
- Workplaces: University of Cambridge
- Thesis: A new approach to the theory of renormalised fields (1954)
- Doctoral advisor: Julian Schwinger
- Doctoral students: Elliott H. Lieb; Monica Olvera de la Cruz; Michael Cates; Nigel Goldenfeld; Tanniemola Liverpool; David Sherrington (physicist)

Sir Samuel Frederick Edwards FRS FLSW (1 February 1928 – 7 May 2015) was a Welsh physicist. The Sam Edwards Medal and Prize is named in his honour.

== Early life and studies ==
Edwards was born on 1 February 1928 in Swansea, Wales, the son of Richard and Mary Jane Edwards. He was educated at the Bishop Gore School, Swansea, and Gonville and Caius College, Cambridge, the University of Manchester, and at Harvard University, in the United States. He wrote his thesis under Julian Schwinger on the structure of the electron, and subsequently developed the functional integral form of field theory.

== Academic research ==
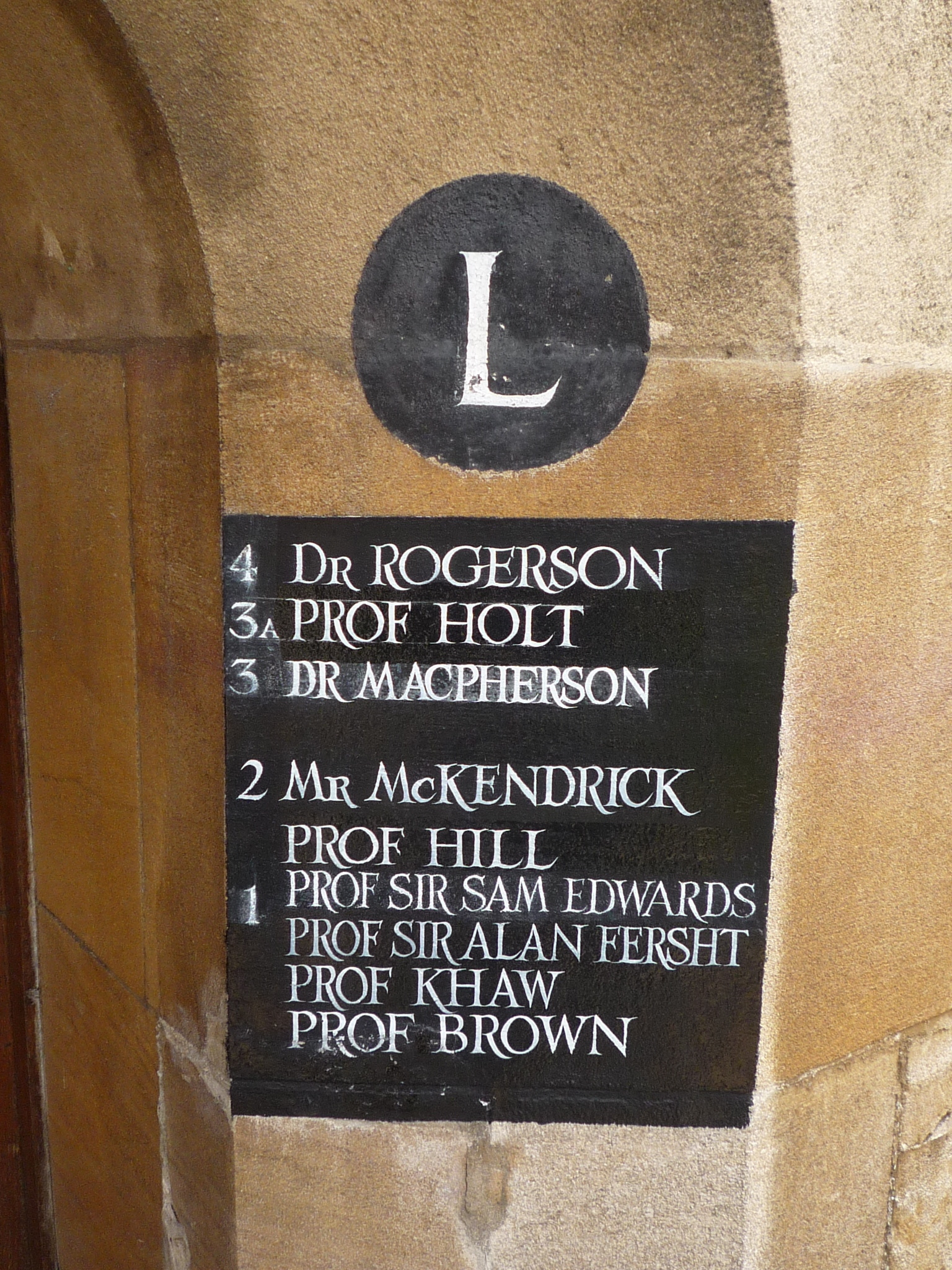
Edwards's name on Staircase L at Gonville & Caius College, Cambridge in 2010.

Edwards's work in condensed matter physics started in 1958 with a paper which showed that statistical properties of disordered systems (glasses, gels etc.) could be described by the Feynman diagram and path integral methods invented in quantum field theory. During the following 35 years Edwards worked in the theoretical study of complex materials, such as polymers, gels, colloids and similar systems. His paper came in 1965 which "in one stroke founded the modern quantitative understanding of polymer matter." Pierre-Gilles de Gennes extended Edwards's 1965 work, ultimately leading to de Gennes's 1991 Nobel Prize in Physics.

Edwards invented what is known as the replica trick or replica method to evaluate the disorder-averaged free energy of glassy systems, which has been successfully applied to spin glass and to amorphous solids. His 1971 paper was the first paper to introduce the replica trick and Edwards' work led ultimately to Giorgio Parisi's 2021 Nobel Prize in Physics.

The Doi-Edwards theory of polymer melt viscoelasticity originated from an initial publication of Edwards in 1967, was expanded upon by de Gennes in 1971, and was subsequently formalized through a series of publications between Edwards and Masao Doi in the late 1970s.

== Administrative activities and professional recognition ==
He was Chairman of the Science Research Council 1973-1977 and between 1984 and 1995 was Cavendish Professor of Physics at Cambridge University. He was a member of the Board of Sponsors of The Bulletin of the Atomic Scientists and Past President of Cambridge Society for the Application of Research.

Edwards was knighted in 1975. Awards presented to him include the Davy Medal (1984) and the Royal Medal (2001) of the Royal Society, the Boltzmann medal of the International Union of Pure and Applied Physics (1995), and the Dirac Medal of the International Centre for Theoretical Physics (2005). He was also a Founding Fellow of the Learned Society of Wales and he held an honorary degree (Doctor of Science) from the University of Bath (1978).

== Personal life ==
In 1953 Edwards married Merriell E.M. Bland, with whom he had three daughters and a son. His relaxations were gardening and chamber music. Edwards died in Cambridge on 7 May 2015.
