= David Sherrington (physicist) =

British theoretical physicist

David Sherrington FRS FInstP
- Born: 1941 (age 84–85); Blackpool, England, UK
- Education: University of Manchester
- Scientific career
- Fields: Physics
- Workplaces: Oxford University; Imperial College London
- Doctoral advisor: Sam Edwards (physicist)
- Doctoral students: Paul Goldbart; Mark Newman

David Sherrington FRS is a British theoretical physicist and Wykeham Professor of Physics Emeritus at the University of Oxford. He is known for his work in condensed matter and statistical physics, and particularly for the invention of the Sherrington-Kirkpatrick model, an exactly solvable mean-field model of a spin glass.

== Career ==
David Sherrington was born in Blackpool, England in 1941 and grew up in Yorkshire. He received an undergraduate degree in physics in 1962 and a PhD in theoretical physics in 1966, both from the University of Manchester. After a brief period as a lecturer at Manchester, he took a position at Imperial College London as a lecturer in physics, rising subsequently to the rank of reader and later professor. In 1989, he moved to Oxford University as a Fellow of New College and to Oxford's Department of Theoretical Physics (now the Rudolf Peierls Centre for Theoretical Physics) as the sixth Wykeham Professor of Physics and head of the department. He retired as head of the department in 2004 and from the professorship in 2008. Sherrington was Editor-in-Chief of the review journal Advances in Physics from 1984 to 2021, and was a founding editor of Communications on Physics as well as editor of the Oxford Monographs in Physics book series starting in 1995.

Among other honours, Sherrington is a Fellow of the Royal Society and a Fellow of the Institute of Physics, the American Physical Society, and the European Academy of Sciences. He was recipient of the Bakerian Medal of the Royal Society in 2001, the Dirac Medal and Prize from the Institute of Physics in 2007 and the Blaise Pascal Medal from the European Academy in 2010.

== Research ==
Sherrington's contributions to theoretical physics are in the areas of condensed matter physics, statistical physics and complex systems, particularly focusing on glassy systems, neural networks and optimization problems. Perhaps his best known contribution is the 1975 invention, with Scott Kirkpatrick, of the Sherrington–Kirkpatrick model of a spin glass. The Sherrington-Kirkpatrick model is an Ising spin glass model in which every spin interacts with every other, with interaction strengths having signs that are chosen independently at random. The importance of the model stems from the fact that it was subsequently shown, in work by Giorgio Parisi, to be exactly solvable for its thermal equilibrium properties. The solution, which was based on the replica method, reveals a phase transition in the model to a glassy phase that displays a loss of ergodicity. Sherrington has made numerous subsequent contributions to replica theory and the theory of spin glasses, and is also notable for his work on complex systems including the minority game (a model of market competition) and early work on the application of statistical mechanics to network theory.

== See also ==
- Spin glass
- Artificial neural network

=== Articles ===
- D. Sherrington; S. Kirkpatrick (1975). "Solvable model of a spin-glass". Physical Review Letters. 35 (26): 1792–1976. Bibcode:1975PhRvL..35.1792S. doi:10.1103/PhysRevLett.35.1792.
- A. Cavagna; J. P. Garrahan; I. Giardina; D. Sherrington (1999). "Thermal model for adaptive competition in a market". Physical Review Letters. 83 (21): 4429–4432. arXiv:cond-mat/9903415. Bibcode:1999PhRvL..83.4429C. doi:10.1103/PhysRevLett.83.4429. S2CID 119093471.
- J. R. Banavar; D. Sherrington; N. Sourlas (1987). "Graph bipartitioning and statistical-mechanics". Journal of Physics A. 20 (1): L1–L8. Bibcode:1987JPhA...20L...1B. doi:10.1088/0305-4470/20/1/001.
