= Dipole glass =

A dipole glass is an analog of a glass where the dipoles are frozen below a given freezing temperature T_{f} introducing randomness thus resulting in a lack of long-range ferroelectric order. A dipole glass is very similar to the concept of a spin glass where the atomic spins don't all align in the same direction (like in a ferromagnetic material) and thus result in a net-zero magnetization. The randomness of dipoles in a dipole glass creates local fields resulting in short-range order but no long-range order.

The dipole glass like state was first observed in Alkali halide crystal-type dielectrics containing dipole impurities. The dipole impurities in these materials result in off-center ions which results in anomalies in certain properties like specific heat, thermal conductivity as well as some spectroscopic properties. Other materials which show a dipolar glass phase include Rb_{(1-x)}(NH_{4})_{x}H_{2}PO_{4} (RADP) and Rb_{(1-x)}(ND_{4})_{x}D_{2}PO_{4} (DRADP). In materials like DRADP the dipole moment is introduced due to the deuteron O-D--O bond. Dipole glass like behavior is also observed in materials like ceramics, 3D water framework and perovskites.

== Random-bond-random-field Ising model (RBRF) ==
The model describing the pseudo-spins (dipole moments) is given by the Hamiltonian as:

$\mathcal{H}=-\frac{1}{2}\sum_{ij}{J_{ij}}{S_i}^{z}{S_j}^{z}-\sum_{i}{f_i}{S_i}^{z}-E\sum_{i}{S_i}^{z}$,

where ${S_i}^{z}$ is the Ising dipole moments. The ${J_{ij}}$ refers to the random bond interactions which are described by a gaussian probability distribution with mean ${J_{0}}$ and variance ${J^{2}/N}$. The second term provides a description of the interactions of the pseudo-spins in presence of random local fields where ${f_{i}}$ are represented by an independent gaussian distribution with zero mean and variance $\Delta$. The final term denotes the interaction in presence of an external electric field ${E}$.

The replica method is used to obtain the glass order parameter:

$q=\int Dz{\tanh}^{2}[J(q+\frac{\Delta}{J^{2}})^{1/2}\frac{z}{T}]$.

where $\int Dz$ is the gaussian measure and under the assumption that ${E}=0$ the free energy is given by:

$\beta{f}=-(\beta{J}/2)^{2}[(1-q_{1})^{2}-m(q_{1}^{2}-q_{0}^{2})]-m^{-1}\int Dz \ln\int Dy Z^{m}(y,z)$.

where $\beta = 1/T$ and $Z^{m}(y,z) = 2\cosh[\beta{h(y,z)}]$ with $h(x,y)= J[(q_{1}-q_{0})^{1/2}y+(q_{0}+\Delta/J^{2})^{1/2}z]$.

The ${f_{i}}$ term is zero in case of magnetic spin glasses and with no presence of an external electric field this model reduces to the Edwards–Anderson model which is used to describe spin glasses. This model has been used to give quantitative description of DRADP type systems.
