= Racah Lectures in Physics =

Annual memorial lecture in Physics

The Racah Lecture is annual memorial lecture given at The Racah Institute of Physics of the Hebrew University of Jerusalem commemorating Prof. Giulio Racah. The lecturers are selected from among the leading physicists in the world.

== List of previous speakers ==
Year	Speaker
1971	Igal Talmi
1972	H. Pekeris
1973	Eugene Wigner
1974	David Pines
1975	Gabriele Veneziano
1976	Pierre-Gilles de Gennes
1977	D. Wilkinson
1978	Hans Bethe
1979	Richard Dalitz
1980	Stanley Mandelstam
1981	Anatole Abragam
1982	Tullio Regge
1983	Haim Harari
1984	Hans Frauenfelder
1985	Edoardo Amaldi
1986	David Gross
1987	Bryce DeWitt
1988	Roy J. Glauber
1989	Francesco Iachello
1990	Jack Steinberger
1991	Alexander Markovich Polyakov
1992	Klaus von Klitzing
1993	Leo Kadanoff
1994	Edward Witten
1995	Michael Berry
1996	Jim Peebles
1997	Giorgio Parisi
1998	Nathan Seiberg
1999	Boris Altshuler
2000	Andrei Linde
2001	Steven Kivelson
2002	Ben Roy Mottelson
2003	Bertrand Halperin
2004	François Englert
2005	Gerard 't Hooft
2006	Jacob Bekenstein
2007	Wolfram Weise
2008	Peter Zoller
2009	Juan Martín Maldacena
2010	"Racah Centennial Conference"
2011	Thomas Witten
2012	Anton Zeilinger
2013	David Spergel
2014	Eva Andrei
2015	Bernard Derrida
2016	Jörg Wrachtrup
2017	Marc Mézard
2018	Rainer Blatt
2019	Herbert Levine
2021	Subir Sachdev
2022	David Robert Nelson
2023	Immanuel Bloch
2024	Zohar Komargodski
2025	Dorit Aharonov
2026	Paul Steinhardt
