= Marc Mézard =

French physicist and academic administrator

Director of the École normale supérieure
- In office 19 April 2012 – 15 March 2022
- Preceded by: Monique Canto-Sperber
- Succeeded by: Frédéric Woms

Personal details
- Born: 29 August 1957 (age 68) Aurillac, France
- Education: Lycée Louis-le-Grand
- Alma mater: École normale supérieure
- Known for: Euclidean random matrix Cavity method Random energy model
- Awards: Ampère Prize (1996); Gay-Lussac Humboldt Prize (2009); Lars Onsager Prize (2016); Racah Lecture (2017); Three Physicists Prize (2021); ICTP Dirac Medal (2026)

Marc Mézard (born 29 August 1957) is a French physicist and academic administrator. He was, from 2012 to 2022, the director of the École normale supérieure (ENS). He is the co-author of two books.

== Early life ==
Marc Mézard was born on 29 August 1957. He graduated from the École normale supérieure in 1976 and earned the agrégation in Physics. He earned a PhD in Physics from University of Paris 6 in 1980.

== Career ==
Mézard joined the Centre national de la recherche scientifique (CNRS) as a researcher in 1981. He was a professor of Physics at the École Polytechnique. In 2001, he joined the Center for Theoretical Physics and Statistical Models at the University of Paris-Sud, and he serves as its director. Since 2012 to 2022, he had also served as the director of his alma mater, the ENS. In 2022 he joined the Department of the Computing Sciences at the Bocconi University in Milan.

Mézard is the author of 170 academic articles and the co-author of two books. He won the Prize Ampère in 1996, the Humboldt Prize in 2009, and the Lars Onsager Prize in 2016.

In 2026, he was awarded the ICTP Dirac Medal for his contributions to statistical mechanics.

== Works ==
- Mézard, Marc; Parisi, Giorgio; Virasoro, Miguel Angel (1987). Spin Glass Theory and Beyond. Singapore: World Scientific. ISBN 9789971501150. OCLC 14929802.
- Mézard, Marc; Montanari, Andrea (2009). Information, Physics, and Computation. Oxford, U.K.: Oxford University Press. ISBN 9780198570837. OCLC 234430714. 1st 15 chapters of 2008 draft version, available at www.stat.ucla.edu
