= Gennaro Auletta =

Italian philosopher

Gennaro Auletta (born August 19, 1957 in Naples, Italy) is an Italian philosopher of science actively involved in scientific research. He is an internationally acknowledged expert in quantum mechanics and in the foundation and interpretation of this discipline. His main interests in quantum information led him to focus his further research on the way in which biological and cognitive systems deal with information. He is also active in the field of the dialogue between science, philosophy and theology, and has been the Vice-Director of the international conference on Biological Evolution: Facts and Theories, held at the Pontifical Gregorian University in March 2009.

== Academics ==
Auletta graduated from the Sapienza University of Rome where he took his PhD and completed his post-doctoral research work. He is an Aggregate Professor at the Pontifical Gregorian University where, from 2003 to 2012, held the position of Scientific Director of the Specialization in Science and Philosophy. He is also Associated Professor at the University of Cassino (Italy). From 2003 to 2010, Auletta has been the Scientific Coordinator of the STOQ Project (“Science, Theology and the Ontological Quest”, a project under the patronage of the Pontifical Council for Culture involving seven Roman Pontifical Universities and supported by the John Templeton Foundation).

Since 2009, Auletta is a Fellow of the Linnean Society of London and of the International Society for Science and Religion.

== Research interests and projects ==
One of the main results of Auletta’s original research on the foundations and interpretation of quantum mechanics is the publication (together with Giorgio Parisi and Mauro Fortunato) of a handbook of Quantum Mechanics, (Cambridge University Press, 2009). Auletta has stressed that there are three basic forms of dealing with information: processing, sharing, selecting. This pathway of research eventually led him to consider quantum information as a fruitful approach for studying the way in which biological and cognitive systems deal with information at all scales. He has now published a book on Cognitive Biology, (Oxford University Press, 2011), in which an attempt is made to show the consistence of such an approach with the recent impressive achievements in life sciences, within the perspective of a thorough reflection on the current paradigm dominating biological disciplines. In particular, Auletta is interested in the relevance of notions like information control, functional equivalence class, formal constraints and top-down causation as to the organisms’ capability of dealing with a challenging environment at the ontogenetic and epigenetic levels, eventually leading to the emergence of new biological functionalities at the phylogenetic level. Top-down causation mechanisms via information control may be considered as the way in which initial and random perturbations disturbing the homeostasis of an organism are subsequently framed in the organism’s network of formal constraints thus giving raise to a process of fine-tuning that ends up in an eventual stable form able to realize a new adaptive fit with certain environmental conditions and challenges. Such process of top-down fine-tuning bridging between randomicity and fitness may be at the basis of the emergence of new functionalities at the phylogenetic scale. Top-down causation via information control may also be enquired in developmental and epigenetic processes (as well as in regeneration processes) when the organism is forced to deal with unpredicted, uncontrollable and in principle noxious environmental stimuli. Finally, information control may be assumed to play a fundamental role also in the ontogenetic action of the organism on the environment (e.g. from chemotaxis up to niche construction as well as to planned actions). Accordingly, his efforts are aimed at both developing a theoretical framework and designing possible experiments and research projects based on the latter standpoints. Recently, he has published a book on the mechanization of inferences, Mechanical Logic in Three-Dimensional Space, (Pan Stanford Pub., Singapore, 2013). Here a reduction of logic to combinatorics is provided. In particular, a logical 3D space is built as a substrate of the logical algebra. Arithmetic operations on propositions allow a new logical calculus.

=== Research projects leadership ===
- (Ongoing) Experiment on Planarians Regeneration in Space (this project has been recently selected by the European Space Agency for its implementation on the International Space Station and sees the collaboration of Emili Salò's group at the Genetic Department of the University of Barcelona).

- (2008-2010) Consciousness and Top-down Causation in Brain and Behavioural Sciences (supported by the John Templeton Foundation, with the participation of leading scholars like Michael A. Arbib, Jean-Pierre Changeux, Antonio Damasio, Marc Jeannerod, Marcus E. Raichle and Wolf Singer).

- (2007-2011) The Reality of Top-down Causation (funded by the CTNS of Berkeley and with the participation, among others, of George Ellis).

== Publications ==
=== Selected books ===
1. G. Auletta, "Boolean Structures: Combinatorics, Codification, Representation", World Scientific, Singapore, 2021; ISBN 978-1-80061-009-5
2. G. Auletta, "The Quantum Mechanics Conundrum: Interpretation and Foundations", Springer, Switzerland,2019; ISBN 978-3-030-16648-9
3. G. Auletta, S.-Y. Wang "Quantum Mechanics for Thinkers", Pan Stanford Pub., Singapore, 2014; ISBN 9789814411714
4. G. Auletta, "Mechanical Logic in Three-Dimensional Space", Pan Stanford Pub., Singapore, 2013; ISBN 9789814411509.
5. G. Auletta (Ed. with I. Colagè and M. Jeannerod), "Brains Top-Down: Is Top-down Causation Challenging Neuroscience?", Singapore, World Scientific, 2013; ISBN 9789814412452.
6. G. Auletta (in collaboration with I. Colagè, P. D’Ambrosio, and L. Torcal), "Integrated Cognitive Strategies in a Changing World", Rome, G&B Press, 2011; ISBN 9788878392076.
7. G. Auletta, Cognitive Biology: Dealing with Information From Bacteria to Minds, Oxford University Press 2011; ISBN 9780199608485.
8. G. Auletta, M. Leclerc, R. A. Martinez (eds.), Biological Evolution: Facts and Theories. A Critical Appraisal 150 years After «The Origin of Species», G&B press 2011; ISBN 9788878391802.
9. G. Auletta, M. Fortunato, G. Parisi, Quantum Mechanics, Cambridge University Press 2009; ISBN 9780521869638.
10. G. Auletta, Foundations and Interpretation of Quantum Mechanics, World Scientific 2001; ISBN 9810240392.

=== Selected papers ===
1. G. Auletta, N. de Sousa, M. Caporicci, J. Vandersteen, J.I. Rojo—Laguna, E. Saló, T. Adell, T., J.J.W.A. van Loon, “Molecular Impact of Launch Related Dynamic Vibrations and Static Hypergravity in Planarians” ["npj Microgravity"] 6 (2020), Art. 25; doi: 10.1038/s41526-020-00115-7.
2. G. Auletta, N. de Sousa, G. Rodriguez-Esteban, I. Colagè, P. D’Ambrosio, J.J.W.A. van Loon, E. Saló, T. Adell, “Transcriptomic Analysis of Planarians under Simulated Microgravity or 8 g Demonstrates That Alteration of Gravity Induces Genomic and Cellular Alterations That Could Facilitate Tumoral Transformation” "International Journal of Molecular Science" 20 (2019), 720; doi:10.3390/ijms20030720.
3. G. Auletta, L. Rondoni, A. Vulpiani, “On the Relevance of the Maximum Entropy Principle in Non–Equilibrium Statistical Mechanics”, ["European Physical Journal: Special Topics"] 2017, 1– 17; doi:10.1140/epjst/e2017-70064-x.
4. G. Auletta, “Networks and Causation Top-Down”, ["Revista Portuguesa de Filosofia"] 72 (2016), 171-80; doi:10.17990/RPF/2016_72_1_0171.
5. G. Auletta, K. Friston, B. Sengupta, “Cognitive Dynamics: From Attractors to Active Inference”, "Proceedings of the IEEE" 102 (2014), 427-45; doi:10.1109/JPROC.2014.2306251.
6. G. Auletta, «Information and Metabolism in Bacterial Chemotaxis», "Entropy" 15 (2013), 311-26; doi:10.3390/e15010311.
7. G. Auletta, «A Paradigm Shift in Biology?», Information 1 (2010), 28-59.
8. G. Auletta and W. Stoeger, «Highlights of the Pontifical Gregorian University’s International Conference on Biological Evolution», Theology and Science 8 (2010): 7-15.
9. G. Auletta, G. Ellis, L. Jaeger, «Top-Down Causation by Information Control: From a Philosophical Problem to a Scientific Research Program», Journal of the Royal Society: Interface 5 (2008): 1159-72.
10. G. Auletta, «Information, Semiotics, and Symbolic Systems», Semiotica 166 (2007): 359-76.
11. G. Auletta, «Quantum Information as a General Paradigm», Foundations of Physics 35 (2005): 787-815.
12. G. Auletta and G. Tarozzi, «Wavelike Correlations versus Path Detection: Another Form of Complementarity», Foundations of Physics Letters 17 (2004): 889-95.
