= Giorgio Parisi =

Italian physicist (born 1948)

Giorgio Parisi OMRI
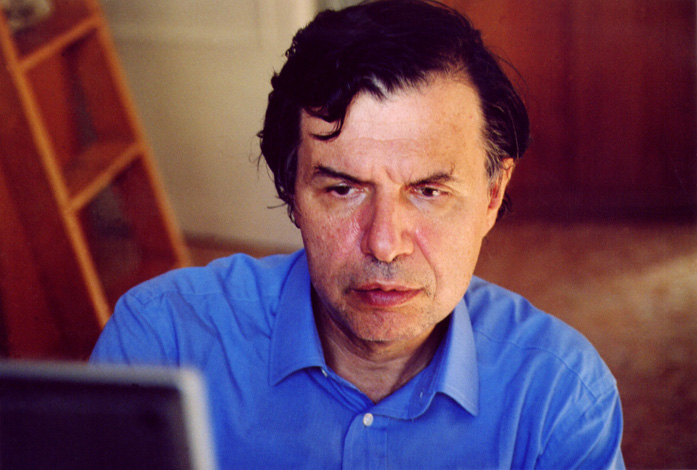
- Parisi in 2006
- Born: 4 August 1948 (age 78); Rome, Italy
- Education: Sapienza University (Laurea)
- Known for: Replica trick Parisi–Sourlas stochastic quantization Altarelli–Parisi equations Kardar–Parisi–Zhang equation
- Awards: Boltzmann Medal; Italgas Prize; Dirac Medal; Enrico Fermi Prize; Dannie Heineman Prize; Nonino Prize; Microsoft Award; Lagrange Prize; Max Planck Medal; EPS HEPP Prize; Lars Onsager Prize; Pomeranchuk Prize; Wolf Prize; Clarivate Citation Laureates; Nobel Prize in Physics (2021)
- Scientific career
- Fields: Physics; Statistical mechanics Quantum field theory
- Workplaces: Sapienza University; Columbia University; Institut des Hautes Études Scientifiques; University of Rome Tor Vergata
- Academic advisors: Nicola Cabibbo

Giorgio Parisi (Italian: [ˈdʒordʒo paˈriːzi]; born 4 August 1948) is an Italian theoretical physicist, whose research has focused on quantum field theory, statistical mechanics and complex systems. His best known contributions are the QCD evolution equations for parton densities, obtained with Guido Altarelli, known as the Altarelli–Parisi or DGLAP equations, the exact solution of the Sherrington–Kirkpatrick model of spin glasses, the Kardar–Parisi–Zhang equation describing dynamic scaling of growing interfaces, and the study of whirling flocks of birds. He was awarded the 2021 Nobel Prize in Physics jointly with Klaus Hasselmann and Syukuro Manabe for groundbreaking contributions to theory of complex systems, in particular "for the discovery of the interplay of disorder and fluctuations in physical systems from atomic to planetary scales".

== Early life and education ==
Giorgio Parisi was born in Rome. He is one-quarter Umbrian, one-quarter Piedmontese, one-quarter Sicilian, and one-quarter Roman for seven generations. He attended the "San Gabriele" High School in Rome in 1966, and later received his degree from the University of Rome La Sapienza in 1970 under the supervision of Nicola Cabibbo with a thesis on the Higgs boson.

== Career ==
After graduating, Parisi began working first at the National Research Council (Italy) (CNR), then at the Istituto Nazionale di Fisica Nucleare (INFN) at the Frascati National Laboratories (1971 to 1981). Introduced by Sidney David Drell to Tsung-Dao Lee, he also worked at Columbia University (1973–1974) and later at the Institut des Hautes Études Scientifiques (1976–1977) and the École Normale Supérieure in Paris (1977–1978), before returning to Italy as a researcher for the INFN. From 1982 until 1992, he was a full professor of Theoretical Physics at the University of Rome Tor Vergata, and from 1992 at the Sapienza University of Rome, where he taught several courses, including theoretical physics, quantum mechanics, statistical physics, and probability.

He also took part in the APE100 project for the study of lattice gauge theory. He was a member of the Simons Collaboration "Cracking the Glass Problem".

After retiring in 2018, until 2021, he was elected president of the Accademia dei Lincei and in 2023 he was also elected Fellow of The World Academy of Sciences.

In February 2021, he won the Wolf Prize in Physics, and in October of the same year, he was awarded the Nobel Prize in Physics.

== Research ==
Parisi's research interests are broad and cover statistical physics, field theory, dynamical systems, mathematical physics and condensed matter physics, where he is particularly known for his work on spin glasses and related statistical mechanics models originating in optimization theory and biology. In particular, he made significant contributions in terms of systematic applications of the replica method to disordered systems, even though the replica method itself was originally discovered in 1971 by Sir Sam Edwards.

He has also contributed to the field of elementary particle physics, in particular to quantum chromodynamics and string theory. Together with Guido Altarelli, he introduced the so-called Dokshitzer–Gribov–Lipatov–Altarelli–Parisi equations. In the field of fluid dynamics he is known for having introduced, together with Uriel Frisch, multifractal models to describe the phenomenon of intermittency in turbulent flows. He is also known for the Kardar–Parisi–Zhang equation modelling stochastic aggregation. From the point of view of complex systems, he worked on the collective motion of animals (such as swarms and flocks). He also introduced, together with other Italian physicists, the concept of stochastic resonance in the study of climate change.

== Honours and awards ==
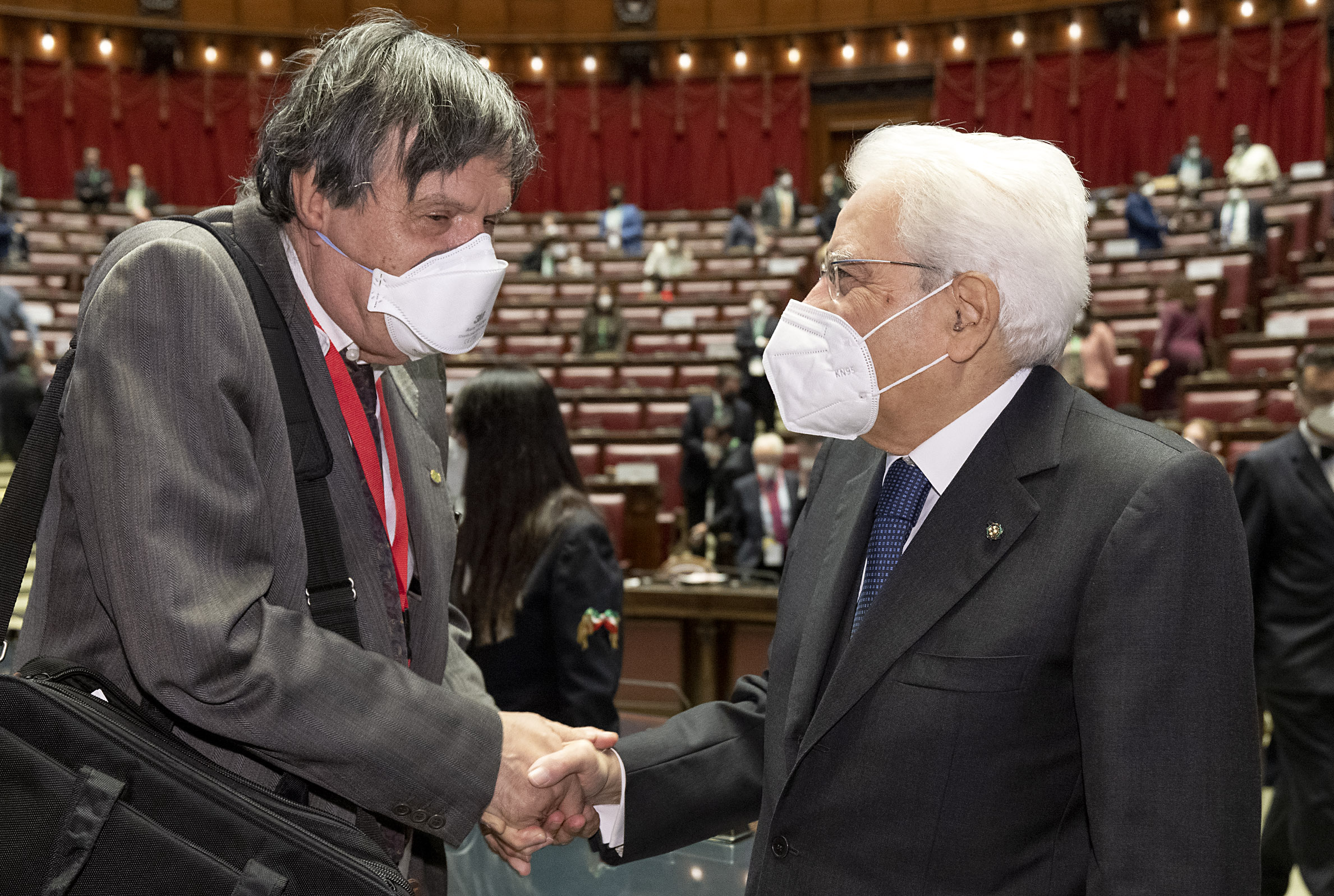
Parisi with Italian President Sergio Mattarella in 2021

Giorgio Parisi is a foreign member of the French Academy of Sciences, the American Philosophical Society, and the United States National Academy of Sciences.

- Feltrinelli Prize, 1986."Premi Antonio Feltrinelli". 15 May 2021.
- Boltzmann Medal, 1992.

"The Boltzmann Medal for 1992 is awarded to Giorgio Parisi for his fundamental contributions to statistical physics, and particularly for his solution of the mean field theory of spin glasses."

- Italgas Prize for Physics, 1993.
- Dirac Medal of the ICTP, 1999.

"Giorgio Parisi is distinguished for his original and deep contributions to many areas of physics ranging from the study of scaling violations in deep inelastic processes (Altarelli–Parisi equations), the proposal of the superconductor's flux confinement model as a mechanism for quark confinement, the use of supersymmetry in statistical classical systems, the introduction of multifractals in turbulence, the stochastic differential equation for growth models for random aggregation (the Kardar–Parisi–Zhang equation) and his groundbreaking analysis of the replica method that has permitted an important breakthrough in our understanding of glassy systems and has proved to be instrumental in the whole subject of Disordered Systems."

- Enrico Fermi Prize, 2002.

"For his contributions to field theory and statistical mechanics, and in particular for his fundamental results concerning the statistical properties of disordered systems."

- Dannie Heineman Prize for Mathematical Physics, 2005.

"For fundamental theoretical discoveries in broad areas of elementary particle physics, quantum field theory, and statistical mechanics; especially for work on spin glasses and disordered systems."

- Nonino Prize “An Italian Master of our Time”, 2005.

"World-famous theoretic physicist, Giorgio Parisi is an investigator of the unpredictable, this means of all that happens in the real world and of its probable laws. A pioneer of complexity, his research of rules and balances inside chaotic systems hypothesizing mathematical instruments, may take to great discoveries in all the fields of human knowledge, from immunology to cosmology. His is a research of the next “Ariadne's thread” of the labyrinth of our existence."

- Microsoft Award, 2007.

"He has made outstanding contributions to elementary particle physics, quantum field theory and statistical mechanics, in particular to the theory of phase transitions and replica symmetry breaking for spin glasses. His approach of using computers to corroborate the conclusions of analytical proofs and to actively motivate further research has been of fundamental importance in his field."

- Lagrange Prize, 2009. Awarded to scientists who have contributed most to the development of the science of complexity in various areas of knowledge.
- Max Planck Medal, 2011.

“For his significant contributions in theoretical elementary particle physics and quantum field theory and statistical physics, especially of systems with frozen disorder, especially spin glasses."

- Nature Awards for Mentoring in Science – Italy, 2013 Lifetime achievement award. The Prize is awarded annually to a different country by the scientific journal "Nature".
- High Energy and Particle Physics Prize – EPS HEPP Prize, 2015.

“For developing a probabilistic field theory framework for the dynamics of quarks and gluons, enabling a quantitative understanding of high-energy collisions involving hadrons”.

- Lars Onsager Prize, 2016.

“For groundbreaking work applying spin glass ideas to ensembles of computational problems, yielding both new classes of efficient algorithms and new perspectives on phase transitions in their structure and complexity”.

- Pomeranchuk Prize, 2018.

“For outstanding results in quantum field theory, statistical mechanics and particle theory”.

- Honorary Doctorate in Science, the University of Extremadura (2019).
- Wolf Prize, 2021.

“For ground-breaking discoveries in disordered systems, particle physics and statistical physics. The Wolf Prize in Physics is awarded to Giorgio Parisi for being one of the most creative and influential theoretical physicists in recent decades. His work has a large impact on diverse branches of physical sciences, spanning the areas of particle physics, critical phenomena, disordered systems as well as optimization theory and mathematical physics.”.

- Inserted in Clarivate Citation Laureates, 2021.

"For ground-breaking discoveries in quantum-chromodynamics and in the study of complex disordered systems.".

- Nobel Prize in Physics, 2021.

“For the discovery of the interplay of disorder and fluctuations in physical systems from atomic to planetary scales.”.

- Cavaliere di Gran Croce OMRI, 2021

== Activism ==
Since 2016, Giorgio Parisi has been leading the movement "Salviamo la Ricerca Italiana" to put pressure on the Italian and European governments to start funding basic research above the subsistence level.

== Selected publications ==
- Parisi, Giorgio (1988). Statistical Field Theory. Addison Wesley. ISBN 978-0201059854.
- Mézard, Marc; Giorgio Parisi; Miguel Angel Virasoro (1987). Spin glass theory and beyond. Singapore: World Scientific. ISBN 978-9971501150.
- Parisi, Giorgio (2006). La chiave, la luce, l'ubriaco. Roma: Di Renzo Editore. ISBN 978-8883231490.
- Parisi, Giorgio; Auletta Gennaro; Fortunato Mauro (2009). Quantum Mechanics. Cambridge University Press. ISBN 978-0521869638.
- Parisi, Giorgio; Urbani Pierfrancesco; Zamponi Francesco (2020). Theory of Simple Glasses. Cambridge University Press. ISBN 978-1108120494.

== See also ==
- Asymptotic safety in quantum gravity
- Cavity method
- Euclidean random matrix
- Parisi–Sourlas stochastic quantization procedure
- p-adic quantum mechanics
- Renormalon
- Self-consistency principle in high energy physics
- Stochastic quantization
