= Random energy model =

In the statistical physics of disordered systems, the random energy model is a toy model of a system with quenched disorder, such as a spin glass, having a first-order phase transition. It concerns the statistics of a collection of $N$ spins (i.e. degrees of freedom $\boldsymbol\sigma\equiv \{\sigma_i\}_{i=1}^N$ that can take one of two possible values $\sigma_i=\pm 1$) so that the number of possible states for the system is $2^N$. The energies of such states are independent and identically distributed Gaussian random variables $E_x \sim \mathcal{N}(0,N/2)$ with zero mean and a variance of $N/2$. Many properties of this model can be computed exactly. Its simplicity makes this model suitable for pedagogical introduction of concepts like quenched disorder and replica symmetry.

== Thermodynamic quantities ==
Critical energy per particle: $h_c = \sqrt{\ln 2}$.

Critical inverse temperature $\beta_c = 2\sqrt{\ln 2}$.

Partition function $Z(\beta) = \sum_s e^{-\beta H(s)}$, which at large $N$ becomes $2^N \mathbb E_E[e^{-\beta E}]$ when $\beta < \beta_c$, that is, condensation does not occur. When this is true, we say that it has the self-averaging property.

Free entropy per particle
$$f(\beta) =  \lim_{N \to \infty} \frac 1N \ln Z = \begin{cases} \ln 2 + \frac 14 \beta^2 \quad & \beta < \beta_c, \\
\beta \sqrt{\ln 2} \quad & \beta > \beta_c \end{cases}$$

Entropy per particle
$$s(h) = \max_\beta(f(\beta) - \beta h) = \begin{cases} \ln 2 - h^2 \quad & h \in [-h_c, +h_c ], \\ 0 \quad & \text{else }\end{cases}$$

== Condensation ==
When $\beta < \beta_c$, the Boltzmann distribution of the system is concentrated at energy-per-particle $h = -\beta/2$, of which there are $\sim e^{N(\ln 2 - \beta^2/4)}$ states.

When $\beta > \beta_c$, the Boltzmann distribution of the system is concentrated at $h = -h_c$, and since the entropy per particle at that point is zero, the Boltzmann distribution is concentrated on a sub-exponential number of states. This is a phase transition called condensation.

=== Participation ===
Define the participation ratio as
$$Y = \sum_E p_E^2 = \frac{\sum_E e^{-2\beta E}}{(\sum_E e^{-\beta E})^2}$$
The participation ratio measures the amount of condensation in the Boltzmann distribution. It can be interpreted as the probability that two randomly sampled states are exactly the same state. Indeed, it is precisely the Simpson index, a commonly used diversity index.

For each $N, \beta$, the participation ratio is a random variable determined by the energy levels.

When $\beta < \beta_c$, the system is not in the condensed phase, and so by asymptotic equipartition, the Boltzmann distribution is asymptotically uniformly distributed over $\sim e^{N(\ln 2 - \beta^2/4)}$ states. The participation ratio is then
$$\sim e^{N(\ln 2 - \beta^2/4)} \times (e^{-N(\ln 2 - \beta^2/4)})^2 = e^{-N(\ln 2 - \beta^2/4)}$$
which decays exponentially to zero.

When $\beta > \beta_c$, the participation ratio satisfies
$$\lim_{N\to\infty} \mathbb E [Y] = 1 - \frac{\beta_c}{\beta}$$
where the expectation is taken over all random energy levels.

== Comparison with other disordered systems ==
The $r$-spin infinite-range model, in which all $r$-spin sets interact with a random, independent, identically distributed interaction constant, becomes the random energy model in a suitably defined $r\to\infty$ limit.

More precisely, if the Hamiltonian of the model is defined by

$$H(\boldsymbol\sigma)=\sum_{\{i_1,\ldots,i_r\}}J_{i_1,\ldots i_r} \sigma_{i_1} \cdots \sigma_{i_r},$$

where the sum runs over all ${N\choose r}$ distinct sets of $r$ indices, and, for each such set, $\{i_1,\ldots,i_r\}$, $J_{i_1,\ldots,i_r}$ is an independent Gaussian variable of mean 0 and variance $J^2r!/(2 N^{r-1})$, the Random-Energy model is recovered in the $r\to\infty$ limit.

== Derivation of thermodynamical quantities ==
As its name suggests, in the REM each microscopic state has an independent distribution of energy. For a particular realization of the disorder, $P(E) = \delta(E - H(\sigma))$ where $\sigma=(\sigma_i)$ refers to the individual spin configurations described by the state and $H(\sigma)$ is the energy associated with it. The final extensive variables like the free energy need to be averaged over all realizations of the disorder, just as in the case of the Edwards–Anderson model. Averaging $P(E)$ over all possible realizations, we find that the probability that a given configuration of the disordered system has an energy equal to $E$ is given by

$$[P(E)] = \sqrt{\frac{1}{N\pi J^2}}\exp\left(-\dfrac{E^2}{J^2 N}\right),$$

where $[\cdots]$ denotes the average over all realizations of the disorder. Moreover, the joint probability distribution of the energy values of two different microscopic configurations of the spins, $\sigma$ and $\sigma'$ factorizes:

$$[P(E,E')]=[P(E)]\,[P(E')].$$

It can be seen that the probability of a given spin configuration only depends on the energy of that state and not on the individual spin configuration.

The entropy of the REM is given by

$$S(E) = N\left[\log 2 - \left(\frac E {NJ}\right)^2\right]$$

for $|E| < NJ\sqrt{\log 2}$. However this expression only holds if the entropy per spin, $\lim_{N\to\infty}S(E)/N$ is finite, i.e., when $|E|< -N J \sqrt{\log 2}.$ Since $(1/T)=\partial S/\partial E$, this corresponds to $T>T_c=1/(2\sqrt{\log 2})$. For $T<T_c$, the system remains "frozen" in a small number of configurations of energy $E\simeq -N J \sqrt{\log 2}$ and the entropy per spin vanishes in the thermodynamic limit.

== See also ==
- Random subcube model
