= Efim Fradkin =

Russian physicist

Efim Samoilovich Fradkin (Russian: Ефим Самойлович Фрадкин) (November 30, 1924 – May 25, 1999) was a Russian physicist.

== Biography ==
Fradkin was born in Shchedrin near Zhlobin (now Belarus), then in the Soviet Union, in 1924.

From 1942 to 1947, Fradkin served in the Soviet Army and in 1945 became a member of the CPSU. In 1948 he graduated from the University of L'vov. That same year he began working at the Institute of Physics of the Academy of Sciences of the USSR. His major works are devoted to quantum field theory, quantum statistics, and hydrodynamics. Fradkin has used the methods of functional analysis in the theory of relativists fields. He developed a modified perturbation theory for the theory of interacting particles. He obtained renormalized field theory equations and studied their solution. He also introduced functional methods into quantum statistics, in which he developed the diagram technique.

He was awarded the USSR State Prize in 1953 (Stalin Prize of First Degree), Igor Tamm Prize of the USSR Academy of Sciences in 1980, and the Dirac Prize of ICTP in 1989.

In 1996–1997, Fradkin was a guest professor of the director-general of the European Organization for Nuclear Research (CERN) and a member of the organization's Theory Division.
