= Short range order =

When crystalline ordering in a solid only extends a short distance

In crystallography, short range order refers to the regular and predictable arrangement (i.e. crystalline lattice) of atoms over a short distance, usually with one or two atom spacings. However, this regularity described by short-range order does not necessarily apply to a larger area. Examples of materials with short range order include amorphous materials such as wax, glass and liquids as well as the collagen fibrils of the stroma in the cornea.

Besides ordering of atoms, short-range ordering of vacancies are also possible. Example of systems with short-range ordering of oxygen-vacancies include oxygen-deficient stoichiometries of the superconductors YBa_{2}Cu_{2}O_{7−δ}, Nd_{2−x}Ce_{x}CuO_{4−y}; as well as perovskites and novel bismuth sillenites.

== See also ==
- Order and disorder
- Structure of liquids and glasses
