= Orientational glass =

Physical property

In solid-state physics, an orientational glass is a molecular solid in which crystalline long-range order coexists with quenched disorder in some rotational degree of freedom.

An orientational glass is either obtained by quenching a plastic crystal, (e.g. cyclohexane, levoglucosan), or it is a mixed crystal in which positional disorder causes additional disorder of molecular orientations, e.g. CN orientations in KCN:KBr.
