= Euclidean random matrix =

Within mathematics, an N×N Euclidean random matrix Â is defined with the help of an arbitrary deterministic function f(r, r′) and of N points {r_{i}} randomly distributed in a region V of d-dimensional Euclidean space. The element A_{ij} of the matrix is equal to f(r_{i}, r_{j}): A_{ij} = f(r_{i}, r_{j}).

== History ==
Euclidean random matrices were first introduced in 1999. They studied a special case of functions f that depend only on the distances between the pairs of points: f(r, r′) = f(r - r′) and imposed an additional condition on the diagonal elements A_{ii},

A_{ij} = f(r_{i} - r_{j}) - u δ_{ij}Σ_{k}f(r_{i} - r_{k}),

motivated by the physical context in which they studied the matrix. A Euclidean distance matrix is a particular example of Euclidean random matrix with either f(r_{i} - r_{j}) = |r_{i} - r_{j}|^{2} or f(r_{i} - r_{j}) = |r_{i} - r_{j}|.

For example, in many biological networks, the strength of interaction between two nodes depends on the physical proximity of those nodes. Spatial interactions between nodes can be modelled as a Euclidean random matrix, if nodes are placed randomly in space.

== Properties ==
Because the positions of the points {r_{i}} are random, the matrix elements A_{ij} are random too. Moreover, because the N×N elements are completely determined by only N points and, typically, one is interested in N≫d, strong correlations exist between different elements.

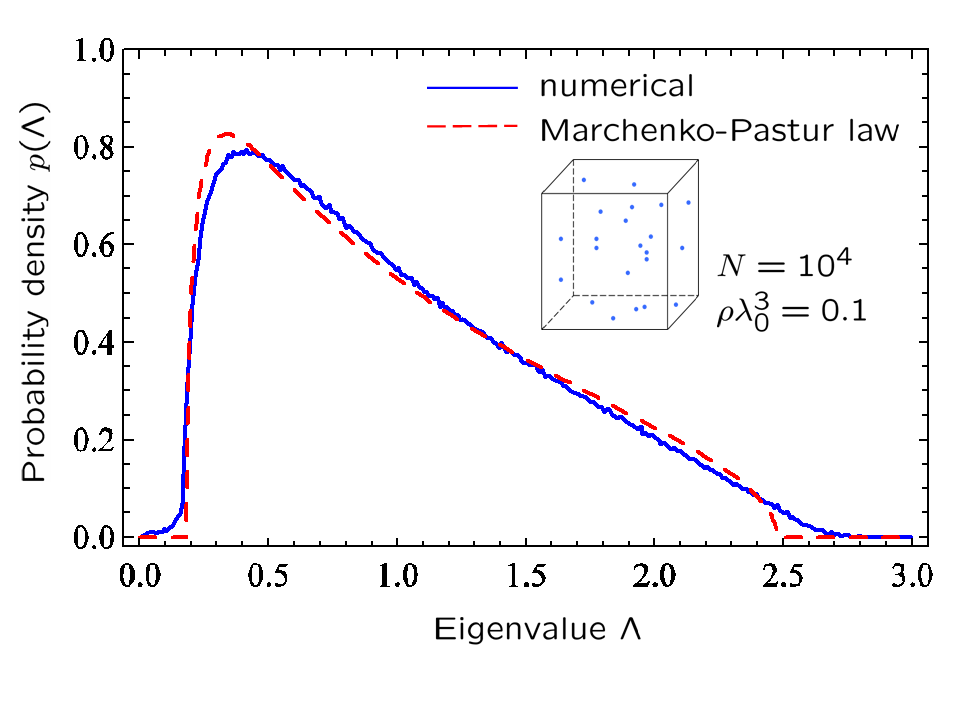
Example of the probability distribution of eigenvalues Λ of the Euclidean random matrix generated by the function f(r, r′) = sin(k_{0}ǀr-r′ǀ)/(k_{0}ǀr-r′ǀ), with k_{0} = 2π/λ_{0}. The Marchenko-Pastur distribution (red) is compared with the result of numerical diagonalization of a set of randomly generated matrices of size N×N. The density of points is ρλ_{0}^{3} = 0.1.

=== Hermitian Euclidean random matrices ===
Hermitian Euclidean random matrices appear in various physical contexts, including supercooled liquids, phonons in disordered systems, and waves in random media.

Example 1: Consider the matrix Â generated by the function f(r, r′) = sin(k_{0}|r-r′|)/(k_{0}|r-r′|), with k_{0} = 2π/λ_{0}. This matrix is Hermitian and its eigenvalues Λ are real. For N points distributed randomly in a cube of side L and volume V = L^{3}, one can show that the probability distribution of Λ is approximately given by the Marchenko-Pastur law, if the density of points ρ = N/V obeys ρλ_{0}^{3} ≤ 1 and 2.8N/(k_{0} L)^{2} < 1 (see figure).

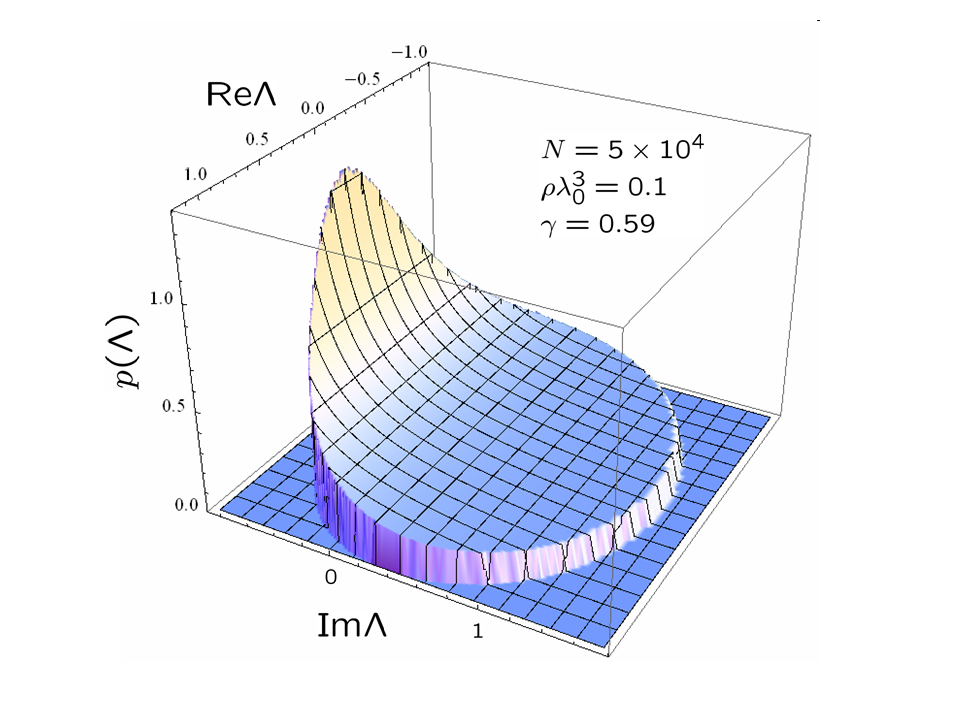
Example of the probability distribution of eigenvalues Λ of the Euclidean random matrix generated by the function f(r, r′) = exp(ik_{0}ǀr-r′ǀ)/(k_{0}ǀr-r′ǀ), with k_{0} = 2π/λ_{0} and f(r= r′) = 0.

=== Non-Hermitian Euclidean random matrices ===
A theory for the eigenvalue density of large (N≫1) non-Hermitian Euclidean random matrices has been developed and has been applied to study the problem of random laser.

Example 2: Consider the matrix Â generated by the function f(r, r′) = exp(ik_{0}|r-r′|)/(k_{0}|r-r′|), with k_{0} = 2π/λ_{0} and f(r= r′) = 0. This matrix is not Hermitian and its eigenvalues Λ are complex. The probability distribution of Λ can be found analytically if the density of point ρ = N/V obeys ρλ_{0}^{3} ≤ 1 and 9N/(8k_{0} R)^{2} < 1 (see figure).
