= Order and disorder =

Presence/absence of symmetry or correlation in a many-particle system

In physics, the terms order and disorder designate the presence or absence of some symmetry or correlation in a many-particle system.

In condensed matter physics, systems typically are ordered at low temperatures; upon heating, they undergo one or several phase transitions into less ordered states. Examples for such an order-disorder transition are:

- the melting of ice: solid–liquid transition, loss of crystalline order;
- the demagnetization of iron by heating above the Curie temperature: ferromagnetic–paramagnetic transition, loss of magnetic order.

The degree of freedom that is ordered or disordered can be translational (crystalline ordering), rotational (ferroelectric ordering), or a spin state (magnetic ordering).

The order can consist either in a full crystalline space group symmetry, or in a correlation. Depending on how the correlations decay with distance, one speaks of long range order or short range order.

If a disordered state is not in thermodynamic equilibrium, one speaks of quenched disorder. For instance, a glass is obtained by quenching (supercooling) a liquid. By extension, other quenched states are called spin glass, orientational glass. In some contexts, the opposite of quenched disorder is annealed disorder.

== Characterizing order ==
=== Lattice periodicity and X-ray crystallinity ===
The strictest form of order in a solid is lattice periodicity: a certain pattern (the arrangement of atoms in a unit cell) is repeated again and again to form a translationally invariant tiling of space. This is the defining property of a crystal. Possible symmetries have been classified in 14 Bravais lattices and 230 space groups.

Lattice periodicity implies long-range order: if only one unit cell is known, then by virtue of the translational symmetry it is possible to accurately predict all atomic positions at arbitrary distances. During much of the 20th century, the converse was also taken for granted – until the discovery of quasicrystals in 1982 showed that there are perfectly deterministic tilings that do not possess lattice periodicity.

Besides structural order, one may consider charge ordering, spin ordering, magnetic ordering, and compositional ordering. Magnetic ordering is observable in neutron diffraction.

It is a thermodynamic entropy concept often displayed by a second-order phase transition. Generally speaking, high thermal energy is associated with disorder and low thermal energy with ordering, although there have been violations of this. Ordering peaks become apparent in diffraction experiments at low energy.

=== Long-range order ===
Long-range order characterizes physical systems in which remote portions of the same sample exhibit correlated behavior.

This can be expressed as a correlation function, namely the spin-spin correlation function:

$$G(x,x') = \langle s(x),s(x') \rangle. \,$$

where s is the spin quantum number and x is the distance function within the particular system.

This function is equal to unity when $x=x'$ and decreases as the distance $|x-x'|$ increases. Typically, it decays exponentially to zero at large distances, and the system is considered to be disordered. But if the correlation function decays to a constant value at large $|x-x'|$ then the system is said to possess long-range order. If it decays to zero as a power of the distance then it is called quasi-long-range order (for details see Chapter 11 in the textbook cited below. See also Berezinskii–Kosterlitz–Thouless transition). Note that what constitutes a large value of $|x-x'|$ is understood in the sense of asymptotics.

== Quenched disorder ==
In statistical physics, a system is said to present quenched disorder when some parameters defining its behavior are random variables which do not evolve with time. These parameters are said to be quenched or frozen. Spin glasses are a typical example. Quenched disorder is contrasted with annealed disorder in which the parameters are allowed to evolve themselves.

Mathematically, quenched disorder is more difficult to analyze than its annealed counterpart as averages over thermal noise and quenched disorder play distinct roles. Few techniques to approach each are known, most of which rely on approximations. Common techniques used to analyze systems with quenched disorder include the replica trick, based on analytic continuation, and the cavity method, where a system's response to the perturbation due to an added constituent is analyzed. While these methods yield results agreeing with experiments in many systems, the procedures have not been formally mathematically justified. Recently, rigorous methods have shown that in the Sherrington-Kirkpatrick model, an archetypal spin glass model, the replica-based solution is exact. The generating functional formalism, which relies on the computation of path integrals, is a fully exact method but is more difficult to apply than the replica or cavity procedures in practice.

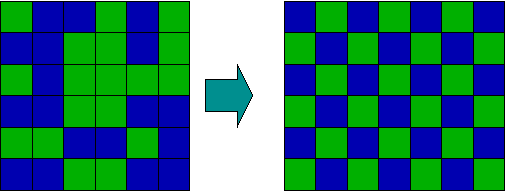
Transition from disordered (left) to ordered (right) states

== Annealed disorder ==
A system is said to present annealed disorder when some parameters entering its definition are random variables, but whose evolution is related to that of the degrees of freedom defining the system. It is defined in opposition to quenched disorder, where the random variables may not change their values.

Systems with annealed disorder are usually considered to be easier to deal with mathematically, since the average on the disorder and the thermal average may be treated on the same footing.

== See also ==
- In high energy physics, the formation of the chiral condensate in quantum chromodynamics is an ordering transition; it is discussed in terms of superselection.
- Entropy
- Topological order
- Impurity
- Superstructure (condensed matter)
