= Leo P. Kadanoff Prize =

The Leo P. Kadanoff Prize is awarded annually by the American Physical Society (APS) for outstanding research in statistical or nonlinear physics. The research can be theoretical, experimental, or computational.

The award was established by the APS Topical Group on Statistical and Nonlinear Physics in 2018 as a memorial tribute to Leo P. Kadanoff, a member (elected in 1978) of the National Academy of Sciences, a co-winner of the 1980 Wolf Prize in Physics, and the president of the APS in 2007–2008. The award consists of $10,000, a medal, a certificate, and limited travel expenses to the APS meeting where the award is conferred. The award was initially established with contributions from family, friends, and colleagues of Kadanoff and was later fully endowed by a large, anonymous gift.

== Recipients ==
Year	Recipient	Institution at time of award	Awarded for (according to official APS citation)
2019	M. Cristina Marchetti	University of California, Santa Barbara	For original contributions to equilibrium and non-equilibrium statistical mechanics, including profound work on equilibrium and driven vortex systems, and fundamental research and leadership in the growing field of active matter.
2020	Nigel Goldenfeld	University of Illinois Urbana-Champaign	For profound contributions to the fields of dynamical pattern formation, superconductivity, and fluid turbulence, together with creative developments and exposition of the theory of the renormalization group.
2021	Sidney Redner	Santa Fe Institute	For leadership in transcending traditional disciplinary boundaries by applying and advancing deep concepts and methods of statistical physics to gain novel insights into diverse real-world phenomena.
2022	Katepalli R. Sreenivasan	New York University	For pioneering experimental, theoretical, and numerical research on the nonlinear and multifractal foundations of turbulent flows.
2023	Itamar Procaccia	The Weizmann Institute of Science	For groundbreaking contributions to statistical and nonlinear physics, including the Grassberger-Procaccia algorithm for obtaining the attractor dimension from chaotic time series, and approaches to describe complex multifractals, diffusion-limited aggregation, and polymer drag reduction in turbulent flows.
2024	Mark Newman	University of Michigan	For fundamental contributions to the statistical physics of complex networks.
2025	Andrea Liu	University of Pennsylvania	For broad contributions to the statistical mechanics of disordered systems and biological matter, including the theory of jamming.
2025	Heinrich M. Jaeger	University of Chicago	For precise experimental contributions that have launched new areas of inquiry and reshaped our understanding of many soft-matter systems, including granular materials and concentrated suspensions, their structure and rheology, and applications such as robotic grippers.
