= Michael Fisher =

English physicist (1931–2021)

- Born: Michael Ellis Fisher; 3 September 1931; Fyzabad, Colony of Trinidad and Tobago
- Died: 26 November 2021 (aged 90)
- Education: King's College London
- Known for: Theory of phase transitions FKT algorithm
- Awards: Irving Langmuir Award (1971); Wolf Prize (1980); Boltzmann Medal (1983); NAS Award for Scientific Reviewing (1983); Lars Onsager Prize (1995); Royal Medal (2005); BBVA Foundation Frontiers of Knowledge Award (2009)
- Scientific career
- Fields: Statistical physics
- Workplaces: King's College London; Cornell University; University of Maryland, College Park
- Doctoral advisor: Donald MacCrimmon MacKay
- Doctoral students: Jill Bonner; Gunduz Caginalp; David A. Huse; Andrea Liu; Graeme Milton; David R. Nelson; Daniel F. Styer

Michael Ellis Fisher (3 September 1931 – 26 November 2021) was an English physicist, as well as chemist and mathematician, known for his many seminal contributions to statistical physics, including but not restricted to the theory of phase transitions and critical phenomena. He was the Horace White Professor of Chemistry, Physics, and Mathematics at Cornell University. Later he moved to the University of Maryland College of Computer, Mathematical, and Natural Sciences, where he was University System of Maryland Regents Professor, a Distinguished University Professor and Distinguished Scholar-Teacher.

== Academic background ==
Michael E. Fisher received his BSc from King's College London in 1951, where he also earned a PhD in physics in 1957, studying analogue computing under Donald MacCrimmon MacKay. He was appointed to the faculty as a lecturer the following year, becoming a full professor in 1965.

In 1966, he moved to Cornell University where he became professor of chemistry, physics, and mathematics, chairing the chemistry department from 1975 to 1978. In 1971, he became a Fellow of the Royal Society. In 1973, he and Jack Kiefer were the first two Cornell faculty elected as Horace White Professors. Fisher was elected Secretary of the Cornell University Senate. In 1983, he was elected a foreign associate of the United States National Academy of Sciences, chemistry section, as he had remained a citizen of the United Kingdom.

Since 1987, he was at the Institute for Physical Science and Technology, which is part of the University of Maryland College of Computer, Mathematical, and Natural Sciences. He retired in 2012.

== Personal life ==
Fisher lived in Ithaca, N.Y., and subsequently in Maryland, with his wife Sorrel. They had four children. Two of them are also theoretical physicists: Daniel S. Fisher is professor of Applied Physics at Stanford, while Matthew P. A. Fisher is professor of Physics at the University of California, Santa Barbara.

== Wolf Prize ==
Fisher together with Kenneth G. Wilson and Leo Kadanoff won the Wolf Prize in 1980. The prize was awarded with the following comment:"Professor Michael E. Fisher has been an extraordinarily productive scientist, and one still at the height of his powers and creativity. Fisher's major contributions have been in equilibrium statistical mechanics, and have spanned the full range of that subject. He was mainly responsible for bringing together, and teaching a common language to chemists and physicists working on diverse problems of phase transitions."

== Boltzmann Medal ==
In 1983, Fisher was awarded the Boltzmann Medal "for his many illuminating contributions to phase transitions and critical phenomena during the past 25 years"

== Lars Onsager Prize ==
Fisher won the Lars Onsager Prize in 1995 "for his numerous and seminal contributions to statistical mechanics, including but not restricted to the theory of phase transitions and critical phenomena, scaling laws, critical exponents, finite size effects, and the application of the renormalization group to many of the above problems" (official laudatio).

== Award and honours ==
- Guggenheim Fellowship (1970)
- Irving Langmuir Prize of the American Physical Society (1971)
- Fellow of the American Academy of Arts and Sciences (1979)
- Guthrie Medal and Prize from the Institute of Physics (1980)
- Wolf Prize (1980)
- Michelson–Morley Award from Case Western Reserve University (1982)
- Boltzmann Medal of the International Union of Pure and Applied Physics (1983)
- Foreign associate of the United States National Academy of Sciences (1983)
- NAS Award for Scientific Reviewing of the National Academy of Sciences (1983)
- Member of the American Philosophical Society (1993)
- Lars Onsager Prize of American Physical Society (1995)
- Royal Medal in physics (2005):
- 2009 BBVA Foundation Frontiers of Knowledge Award in Basic Sciences (co-winner with Richard Zare); see
- 2015 Rudranath Capildeo Prize for Applied Sciences and Technology-Gold, awarded by the Trinidad and Tobago's National Institute of Higher Education, Research, Science and Technology (NIHERST)

== Sources ==
- N. David Mermin, "My Life with Fisher", J. Stat. Phys. 110, 467–473 (2003); see also.
