= Pethick =

Pethick is a surname. Notable people with the surname include:

- Christopher J. Pethick (born 1942), English theoretical physicist
- Dorothy Pethick (1881–1970), British suffragette
- Emmeline Pethick-Lawrence (1867–1954), British suffragist
- Frederick Pethick-Lawrence, 1st Baron Pethick-Lawrence, PC (1871–1961), British Labour politician
- Robbie Pethick (born 1970), retired English football defender

== See also ==
- Egloskerry, Cornwall - where a legal precedent was set by the local Pethick family
