= Tin-Lun Ho =

Chinese-American theoretical physicist

Tin-Lun "Jason" Ho (born August 12, 1951) is a Chinese-American theoretical physicist, specializing in condensed matter theory, quantum gases, and Bose-Einstein condensates. He is known for the Mermin-Ho relation.

== Education and career ==
Ho graduated in 1972 with a B.Sc. from Chung Chi College, Chinese University of Hong Kong. He was a graduate student for the academic year 1972–1973 at the University of Minnesota and in 1973 transferred to Cornell University. There he graduated in 1977 with a Ph.D. under the supervision of N. David Mermin. Ho was a postdoc from 1977 to 1980 under the supervision of Christopher J. Pethick at the University of Illinois, from 1978 to 1980 at NORDITA, and from 1980 to 1982 at the Kavli Institute for Theoretical Physics at the University of California, Santa Barbara. At Ohio State University (OSU), he was an assistant professor from 1983 to 1989 and an associate professor from 1989 to 1996, when he became a full professor. At OSU he is since 2002 a Distinguished Professor of Mathematical and Physical Sciences. From 2007 to 2014 he was a member of the editorial board of the Journal of Low Temperature Physics.

Ho was an Alfred P. Sloan Foundation Fellow for the academic year 1984–1985 and a Fellow of the John Simon Guggenheim Memorial Foundation for the academic year 1999–2000.

In 2008 he received the Lars Onsager Prize for "his contributions to quantum liquids and dilute quantum gases, both multi-component and rapidly rotating, and for his leadership in unifying condensed matter and atomic physics research in this area."

Ho was elected in 1999 a Fellow the American Physical Society, in 2011 a Fellow of the American Association for the Advancement of Science, and in 2015 a Member of the American Academy of Arts and Sciences.

He has contributed to a variety of areas in condensed matter physics, including quantum liquid, quasicrystals, and quantum Hall effect. His early work on superfluid He-3 is among the earliest applications of topological ideas in condensed matter. ... he has been working on a wide range of problems in dilute quantum gases, and fostering communications between condensed matter physics and atomic physics communities.

Most recently, he has been working on Bose-Einstein condensates and optical lattices, for which he proposed a cooling mechanism in 2009.

== Selected publications ==
- Ho, Tin-Lun; Shenoy, Vivek B. (1996). "Binary Mixtures of Bose Condensates of Alkali Atoms". Physical Review Letters. 77 (16): 3276–3279. Bibcode:1996PhRvL..77.3276H. doi:10.1103/PhysRevLett.77.3276. PMID 10062180. (over 650 citations)
- Ho, Tin-Lun (1998). "Spinor Bose Condensates in Optical Traps". Physical Review Letters. 81 (4): 742–745. arXiv:cond-mat/9803231. Bibcode:1998PhRvL..81..742H. doi:10.1103/PhysRevLett.81.742. S2CID 18956040. (over 1750 citations)
- Ciobanu, C. V.; Yip, S.-K.; Ho, Tin-Lun (2000). "Phase diagrams of F=2 spinor Bose-Einstein condensates". Physical Review A. 61 (3) 033607. arXiv:cond-mat/9908018. Bibcode:2000PhRvA..61c3607C. doi:10.1103/PhysRevA.61.033607. S2CID 13881807.
- Ho, Tin-Lun; Yip, Sung Kit (2000). "Fragmented and Single Condensate Ground States of Spin-1 Bose Gas". Physical Review Letters. 84 (18): 4031–4034. arXiv:cond-mat/9905339. Bibcode:2000PhRvL..84.4031H. doi:10.1103/PhysRevLett.84.4031. PMID 10990603. S2CID 29387943.
- Ho, Tin-Lun (2001). "Bose-Einstein Condensates with Large Number of Vortices". Physical Review Letters. 87 (6) 060403. arXiv:cond-mat/0104522. Bibcode:2001PhRvL..87f0403H. doi:10.1103/PhysRevLett.87.060403. PMID 11497818. S2CID 7933125.
- Mueller, Erich J.; Ho, Tin-Lun (2002). "Two-Component Bose-Einstein Condensates with a Large Number of Vortices". Physical Review Letters. 88 (18) 180403. arXiv:cond-mat/0201051. Bibcode:2002PhRvL..88r0403M. doi:10.1103/PhysRevLett.88.180403. PMID 12005671. S2CID 1388421.
- Ho, Tin-Lun (2004). "Universal Thermodynamics of Degenerate Quantum Gases in the Unitarity Limit". Physical Review Letters. 92 (9) 090402. arXiv:cond-mat/0309109. Bibcode:2004PhRvL..92i0402H. doi:10.1103/PhysRevLett.92.090402. PMID 15089456. S2CID 30208714. (over 550 citations)
- Ho, Tin-Lun; Mueller, Erich J. (2004). "High Temperature Expansion Applied to Fermions near Feshbach Resonance". Physical Review Letters. 92 (16) 160404. arXiv:cond-mat/0306187. Bibcode:2004PhRvL..92p0404H. doi:10.1103/PhysRevLett.92.160404. PMID 15169207. S2CID 19270421.
- Mueller, Erich J.; Ho, Tin-Lun; Ueda, Masahito; Baym, Gordon (2006). "Fragmentation of Bose-Einstein condensates". Physical Review A. 74 (3) 033612. arXiv:cond-mat/0605711. Bibcode:2006PhRvA..74c3612M. doi:10.1103/PhysRevA.74.033612. S2CID 119385837.
- Ho, Tin-Lun; Zhou, Qi (2010). "Obtaining the phase diagram and thermodynamic quantities of bulk systems from the densities of trapped gases". Nature Physics. 6 (2): 131–134. arXiv:0901.0018. Bibcode:2010NatPh...6..131H. doi:10.1038/nphys1477. S2CID 118417606.
- Ho, Tin-Lun; Zhang, Shizhong (2011). "Bose-Einstein Condensates with Spin-Orbit Interaction". Physical Review Letters. 107 (15) 150403. Bibcode:2011PhRvL.107o0403H. doi:10.1103/PhysRevLett.107.150403. PMID 22107273.
- Ho, Tin-Lun (2020). "Imaging the Holon string of the Hubbard model". Proceedings of the National Academy of Sciences. 117 (42): 26141–26144. Bibcode:2020PNAS..11726141H. doi:10.1073/pnas.2004268117. PMC 7584989. PMID 33020280. (See Hubbard model.)
