= David A. Huse =

American theoretical physicist

David Alan Huse (born May 16, 1958) is an American theoretical physicist, specializing in statistical physics and condensed matter physics. Huse is known for his expertise in the fields of statistical physics and quantum many-body physics. He has contributions to topics such as phase transitions, spin glasses and magnetic ordering in materials. His current research interests include ultracold atomic systems and non-equilibrium physics, and explore phenomena as quantum thermalization and many body localization.

== Biography ==
After graduating from Lincoln-Sudbury Regional High School, Huse matriculated at the University of Massachusetts Amherst, where he graduated in 1979 with a B.S. in physics. He received in 1983 his Ph.D. from Cornell University with a thesis supervised by Michael E. Fisher. From 1983 to 1996, Huse worked in Bell Laboratories in Murray Hill. In 1996, he was appointed a professor in the physics department of Princeton University. At the Institute for Advanced Study, he has been appointed to positions for the autumn of 2010, and for the academic years 2015–2016, 2019–2020, and 2021–2022.

He was elected in 2010 a member of the American Academy of Arts and Sciences, in 2013 a fellow of the American Association for the Advancement of Science, and in 2017 a member of the National Academy of Sciences. In 2022 he received the Lars Onsager Prize with Boris Altshuler and Igor Aleiner for ""foundational work on many-body localization, its associated phase transition, and implications for thermalization and ergodicity."

In 1982 he married Julia Smith. They have two sons.

== Selected publications ==
- Huse, David A.; Fisher, Michael E. (1984). "Commensurate melting, domain walls, and dislocations". Physical Review B. 29 (1): 239–270. Bibcode:1984PhRvB..29..239H. doi:10.1103/PhysRevB.29.239.
- Huse, D. A.; Henley, C. L. (1985). "Pinning and roughening of domain walls in Ising systems due to random impurities". Physical Review Letters. 54 (25): 2708–2711. Bibcode:1985PhRvL..54.2708H. doi:10.1103/PhysRevLett.54.2708. PMID 10031417.
- Fisher, Daniel S.; Fisher, Matthew P. A.; Huse, David A. (1991). "Thermal fluctuations, quenched disorder, phase transitions, and transport in type-II superconductors". Physical Review B. 43 (1): 130–159. Bibcode:1991PhRvB..43..130F. doi:10.1103/PhysRevB.43.130. PMID 9996198.
- Oganesyan, Vadim; Huse, David A. (2007). "Localization of interacting fermions at high temperature". Physical Review B. 75 (15) 155111. arXiv:cond-mat/0610854. Bibcode:2007PhRvB..75o5111O. doi:10.1103/PhysRevB.75.155111. S2CID 119488834.
- Pal, Arijeet; Huse, David A. (2010). "Many-body localization phase transition". Physical Review B. 82 (17) 174411. arXiv:1010.1992. Bibcode:2010PhRvB..82q4411P. doi:10.1103/PhysRevB.82.174411. S2CID 41528861.
- Huse, David A.; Nandkishore, Rahul; Oganesyan, Vadim; Pal, Arijeet; Sondhi, S. L. (2013). "Localization-protected quantum order". Physical Review B. 88 (1) 014206. arXiv:1304.1158. Bibcode:2013PhRvB..88a4206H. doi:10.1103/PhysRevB.88.014206. S2CID 106398202. Arxiv preprint
- Nandkishore, Rahul; Huse, David A. (2015). "Many-Body Localization and Thermalization in Quantum Statistical Mechanics". Annual Review of Condensed Matter Physics. 6: 15–38. arXiv:1404.0686. Bibcode:2015ARCMP...6...15N. doi:10.1146/annurev-conmatphys-031214-014726. S2CID 118465889. Arxiv preprint
- Gopalakrishnan, Sarang; Müller, Markus; Khemani, Vedika; Knap, Michael; Demler, Eugene; Huse, David A. (2015). "Low-frequency conductivity in many-body localized systems". Physical Review B. 92 (10) 104202. arXiv:1502.07712. Bibcode:2015PhRvB..92j4202G. doi:10.1103/PhysRevB.92.104202. S2CID 76650528.
- Smith, J.; Lee, A.; Richerme, P.; Neyenhuis, B.; Hess, P. W.; Hauke, P.; Heyl, M.; Huse, D. A.; Monroe, C. (2016). "Many-body localization in a quantum simulator with programmable random disorder". Nature Physics. 12 (10): 907–911. arXiv:1508.07026. Bibcode:2016NatPh..12..907S. doi:10.1038/nphys3783. S2CID 53408060.
- Huse, David A.; Leibler, Stanislas (1988). "Phase behaviour of an ensemble of nonintersecting random fluid films" (PDF). Journal de Physique. 49 (4): 605–621. doi:10.1051/jphys:01988004904060500.Plumber's nightmare
