= M. Cristina Marchetti =

American physicist

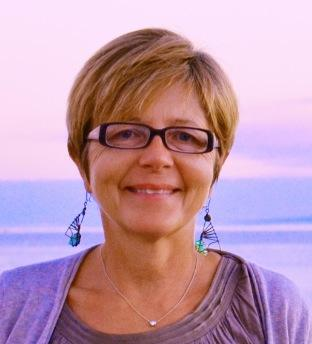
- Marchetti in 2014.
- Born: December 11, 1955 (age 70); Pavia, Italy
- Education: University of Pavia, University of Florida
- Known for: Collective behavior of active matter systems
- Awards: Leo P. Kadanoff Prize (2019)
- Scientific career
- Fields: Statistical physics, Condensed matter theory
- Workplaces: Syracuse University, University of California, Santa Barbara
- Thesis: Fluctuations in systems far from equilibrium (1982)
- Doctoral advisor: James W. Dufty
- Website: marchetti.physics.ucsb.edu

Maria Cristina Marchetti (born 1955) is an Italian-born, American theoretical physicist specializing in statistical physics and condensed matter physics. In 2019, she received the Leo P. Kadanoff Prize of the American Physical Society. She held the William R. Kenan Jr. Distinguished Professorship of Physics at Syracuse University, where she was the director of the Soft and Living Matter program, and chaired the department 2007–2010. She is currently Professor of Physics at the University of California, Santa Barbara.

== Education ==
M. Cristina Marchetti was trained as a physicist at the University of Pavia in Italy. She studied out-of-equilibrium physics for her graduate degree and received a PhD degree from the University of Florida in 1982. Her PhD thesis was entitled "Fluctuations in systems far from equilibrium."

== Professional career ==
Marchetti was an assistant professor at Syracuse University from 1987 to 1997. She then became a professor at Syracuse University from 1997 to 2018. She is now professor at University of California, Santa Barbara. Marchetti was appointed co lead-editor of the journal Physical Review X (PRX), a journal run by the American Physical Society (APS) in 2016. She leads the journal with Jean-Michel Raimond, a professor of physics at the Université Pierre et Marie Curie in Paris, France.

She was elected a fellow of the American Physical Society's (APS) Division of Condensed Matter Physics in 2000 for "contributions to the theory of the dynamics of vortex matter and charge-density waves," and was vice-chair and chair of the APS Group of Statistical and Nonlinear Physics from 2005 to 2008. She became a fellow of the American Association for the Advancement of Science (AAAS) in 2013 and a fellow of the National Academy of Sciences in 2019. She was a co-editor of the Annual Review of Condensed Matter Physics between 2017 and 2025.

== Research ==
Marchetti has made a contribution to the development of the field of active matter, which is matter composed of self-propelled energy-consuming particles. Her research focuses on understanding the structure, phase transitions and rheology of suspensions and gels made of active matter systems like self-propelled particles, biological filaments and biological cells. Marchetti is particularly interested in understanding the behavior of cell colonies that grow in confined geometries such as those found in animal and human tissues. The bulk mechanical properties of these colonies can reveal how the cells in the tissues interact, a problem Marchetti studies theoretically.

== Family ==
Marchetti is married to theoretical physicist Mark Bowick. They have two adult children, Micol and Alessandro Marchetti-Bowick.

== Honors and awards ==
- Fellow of the American Physical Society, Division of Condensed Matter Physics (elected 2000)
- Chancellor's Citation for Academic Achievement, Syracuse University, 2005
- Fellow of the American Association for the Advancement of Science (elected 2013)
- Fellow of the National Academy of Sciences (elected 2019)
- Leo P. Kadanoff Prize, American Physical Society.
- Member of the American Academy of Arts & Sciences (elected 2014)

== Publications ==
- Marchetti, M. C.; et al. (2013). "Hydrodynamics of soft active matter". Reviews of Modern Physics. 85 (3): 1143. Bibcode:2013RvMP...85.1143M. doi:10.1103/RevModPhys.85.1143.
