= Physical Review X =

- Discipline: Physics
- Language: English
- Edited by: Jean-Michel Raimond and M. Cristina Marchetti

Publication details
- History: 2011–present
- Publisher: American Physical Society (United States)
- Frequency: Quarterly
- Open access: Yes
- License: Creative Commons Attribution 3.0 License
- Impact factor: 15.7 (2024)

Standard abbreviations
- ISO 4: Phys. Rev. X

Indexing
- CODEN: PRXHAE
- ISSN: 2160-3308
- LCCN: 2011201149
- OCLC no.: 706478714

Links
- Journal homepage; Online access; Online archive

Physical Review X is a peer-reviewed open access scientific journal published by the American Physical Society covering all branches of pure, applied, and interdisciplinary physics. It is part of the Physical Review family of journals. Since 2022, Ling Miao was appointed full-time chief editor, while Denis Bartolo from École normale supérieure de Lyon is the current lead editor. According to the Journal Citation Reports, the journal had a 2024 impact factor of 15.7.

== History ==
The journal was announced in January 2011 and began publishing papers in August 2011. An early editorial outlined the journal's publishing philosophy. The first editor was Jorge Pullin. Since its start, PRX has launched sister journals such as PRX Quantum, PRX Energy, PRX Life, and PRX Intelligence.

== Metrics ==
| Year | Published articles | IF |
|---|---|---|
| 2015 | 173 | 8.701 |
| 2016 | 204 | 12.789 |
| 2017 | 232 | 14.385 |
| 2018 | 275 | 12.211 |
| 2019 | 235 | 12.577 |
| 2020 | 277 | 15.762 |
| 2021 | 271 | 14.417 |
| 2022 | 224 | 12.5 |
| 2023 | 194 | 11.6 |
| 2024 | 239 | 15.6 |
