= Michael Brenner =

Michael Brenner may refer to:

- Michael Brenner (historian) (born 1964), German-Jewish historian
- Michael P. Brenner, American applied mathematician
- Mike Brenner, American musician
