= Matthew P. A. Fisher =

American physicist

- Born: 19 May 1960 (age 66); London, United Kingdom
- Education: Cornell University; University of Illinois at Urbana-Champaign
- Awards: Alan T. Waterman Award (1995); Oliver E. Buckley Condensed Matter Prize (2015)
- Scientific career
- Fields: Condensed matter physics
- Workplaces: Thomas J. Watson Research Center; Kavli Institute for Theoretical Physics; University of California Santa Barbara
- Doctoral advisor: Anthony Leggett
- Other academic advisors: Eduardo Fradkin
- Doctoral students: Smitha Vishveshwara

Matthew P. A. Fisher is an American theoretical physicist and professor of physics at the University of California, Santa Barbara, and is known for several major contributions to condensed matter physics. He completed his bachelor's degree in engineering physics from Cornell University in 1981 and earned a Ph.D. in theoretical physics from the University of Illinois at Urbana-Champaign in 1986 with Anthony Leggett as his advisor, with part of his work done under the supervision of Eduardo Fradkin. He went on to become first a visiting scientist and then a research staff member at IBM T. J. Watson Research Center (1986–1993). He joined the Kavli Institute for Theoretical Physics and the physics department of the University of California in 1993. In 2007 he joined Microsoft's Station Q as a research physicist, on leave from the UCSB physics department. During the academic year 2009–2010 he was on the faculty at Caltech, returning to the physics department at UCSB in summer 2010.

Fisher was awarded the Alan T. Waterman Award in 1995, and in 2015 he was a recipient of the Oliver E. Buckley Condensed Matter Prize for his work on the superconductor-insulator transition. He was elected to the American Academy of Arts and Sciences in 2003 and to the National Academy of Sciences in 2012. He is a Fellow of the American Physical Society.

Fisher is the son of English physicist Michael E. Fisher, and brother of American physicist Daniel S. Fisher.

== Research ==
Fisher is one of the leading figures in condensed matter physics, and has made important contributions to many areas in condensed matter physics. Some of his most important works have been in the theories of quantum phase transitions, in particular superconductor-insulator transitions (with Daniel Fisher, Steven Girvin and others) and deconfined quantum criticality (with Subir Sachdev, T. Senthil, Ashvin Vishwanath and Leon Balents). He has also made important contributions to superconductivity, in particular, introducing vortex-glass superconductivity as a possible new phase of matter and using bosonic particle-vortex dualities to describe the properties of superconductors (with Dung-Hai Lee). He has also made significant advances in the transport and other aspects of the physics of Luttinger liquids (with Charles Kane) and other one-dimensional problems in condensed matter such as the edges of quantum Hall states. He has also done important works in the area of quantum spin liquids, often using the aforementioned dualities to provide theoretical descriptions of various spin liquid phenomena (with Leon Balents, Michael Hermele, Jason Alicea, Shinsei Ryu and others). He has also made important contributions to the physics of carbon nanotubes (with Leon Balents and Charles Kane) and emergent Majorana fermions and related phenomena in quasi-one-dimensional problems (with Jason Alicea and others).

In recent years, Fisher has developed new interests in neuroscience, where in particular he has proposed the possibility (and mechanisms) of quantum information processing (specifically, quantum mind) in the human brain.
