= Sabine Hossenfelder =

German science communicator and writer

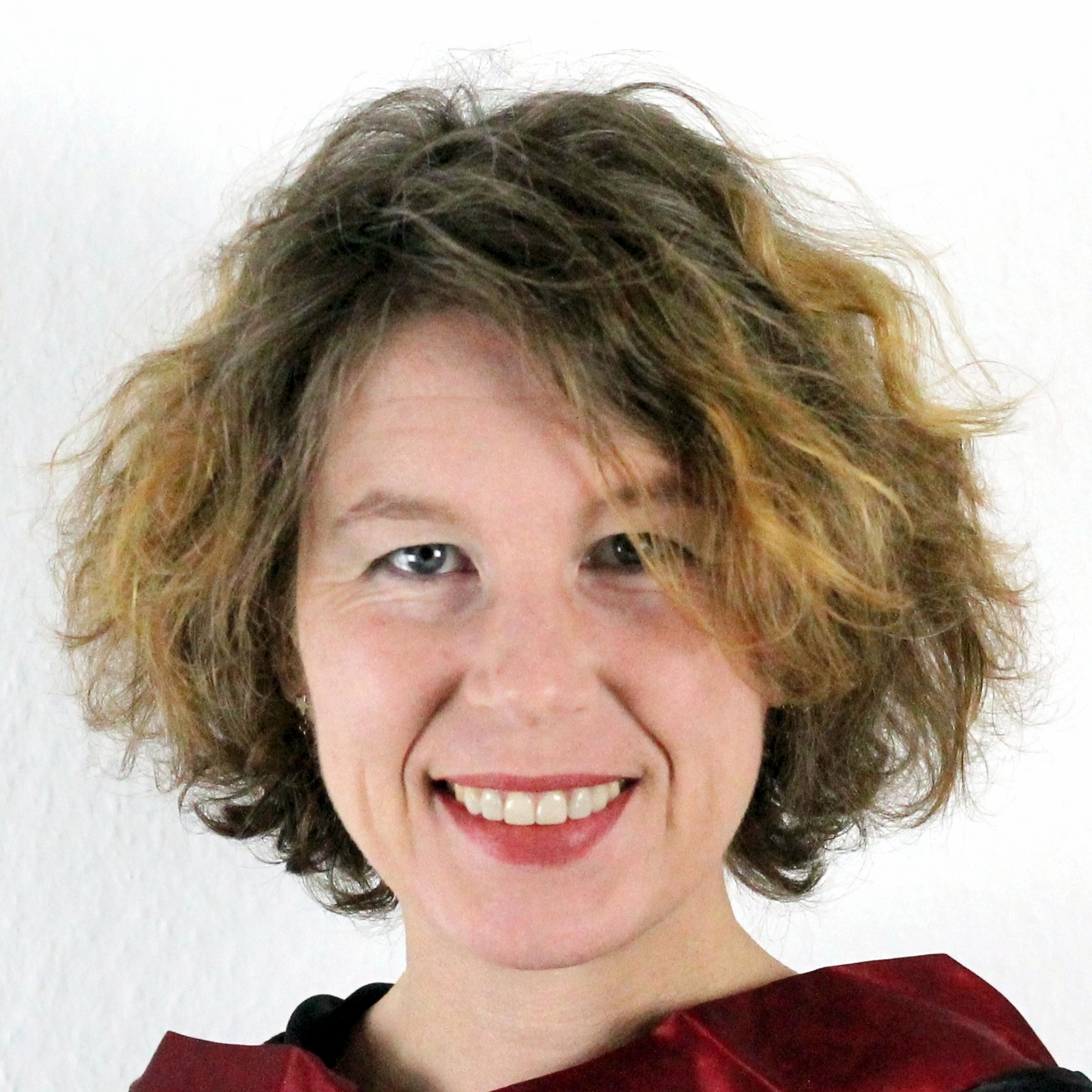
- Hossenfelder in 2017
- Born: Frankfurt, West Germany
- Education: Goethe University Frankfurt (Diploma; Dr. phil. nat., 2003)
- Scientific career
- Fields: Theoretical physics
- Workplaces: GSI Helmholtz Centre, Darmstadt (post-doc); University of Arizona (post-doc); UC Santa Barbara (post-doc); Perimeter Institute, Canada (post-doc); NORDITA (assistant professor, 2009–2015); FIAS (research fellow, 2015–2023); LMU Munich, Munich Center for Mathematical Philosophy (visiting researcher, 2023–2025)
- Thesis: Schwarze Löcher in Extra-Dimensionen: Eigenschaften und Nachweis (2003)
- Doctoral advisor: Horst Stöcker

YouTube information
- Channel: Sabine Hossenfelder
- Years active: 2007–present
- Genre: Science communication
- Subscribers: 1.79 million
- Views: 378 million
- Last updated: 11 September 2026

Sabine Karin Doris Hossenfelder is a German science communicator, writer, and YouTuber who previously worked as an academic theoretical physicist. After working as an academic physicist for two decades, Hossenfelder rose to prominence on YouTube in the early 2020s. By September 2026, her channel had 1.79 million subscribers. Hossenfelder is known for her controversial criticism of modern physics research.

== Early life and education ==
Hossenfelder was born in Frankfurt. She studied mathematics and physics at Goethe University Frankfurt. Hossenfelder later earned a doctorate from the same university in theoretical physics in 2003; her dissertation, supervised by Horst Stöcker, studied microscopic black-hole production in models with large extra dimensions.

== Academic career ==
After post-doctoral posts at the GSI Helmholtz Centre for Heavy Ion Research, University of Arizona, UC Santa Barbara and Perimeter Institute in Canada, she joined NORDITA in Stockholm as an assistant professor in 2009. In 2015, she moved to the Frankfurt Institute for Advanced Studies, where she led the Analog Systems for Gravity Duals group and, in 2019, received the institute's inaugural Award for Innovative Thinking. In 2023, she became affiliated with the LMU Munich Center for Mathematical Philosophy as a visiting researcher, studying the role of locality and fine-tuning in quantum-mechanical foundations. In September 2025, Hossenfelder said that she was no longer affiliated with the center.

Hossenfelder has published research on topics such as quantum gravity, black holes, and dark matter.

== Public engagement ==
Hossenfelder has written the popular-science blog Backreaction since 2006 and has contributed articles to Scientific American, New Scientist and Quanta Magazine. Her first trade book, Lost in Math: How Beauty Leads Physics Astray (Basic Books, 2018), argues that an aesthetic preference for mathematically "beautiful" theories has hindered progress in fundamental physics. Her follow-up, Existential Physics: A Scientist's Guide to Life's Biggest Questions, was published by Viking in 2022, exploring what physics can say about questions such as free will, consciousness and the origin of the universe. In a positive review, Kirkus Reviews stated that the book suggests that "many spiritual ideas are compatible with modern physics".

During the COVID-19 pandemic in the early 2020s, Hossenfelder began focusing on YouTube content explaining science in simple terms. By September 2023, her channel had reached one million subscribers, and NPR reported that income from YouTube helped fund her physics research. By November 2024, creating YouTube videos had become her main activity, while she devoted less time to physics research. As of September 2026, her channel had reached 1.79 million subscribers and approximately 378 million total views.

Hossenfelder is known for her strong criticism of modern academic physics research.

NPR described Hossenfelder's views on modern physics research as "somewhat contrarian". She has written op-eds in The Guardian and The New York Times critiquing particle physics and the search for hypothesized particles using colliders. Responding in a published letter, cosmologist Phil Bull argued that unsuccessful searches also advance science by testing hypotheses and excluding possibilities. Hossenfelder has been criticised by science communicators for her anti-establishment and pessimistic presentation of academia, arguing that it could aid science denialists. In 2024, Hossenfelder described string theory as "undead", but weeks later said that a paper using bootstrapping methods strengthened the argument for the theory.

Writing for McGill University's Office for Science and Society in April 2025, Jonathan Jarry praised Hossenfelder's ability to explain complex science but criticised her broader claims about academic research. He argued that her criticism had expanded from particle physics to claims that science itself was failing, and that her portrayal of publicly funded research as a scam was misleading and risked undermining public trust in science. He also wrote that her videos criticising academic research tended to attract more views than her educational videos. In a September 2025 essay in The Wall Street Journal, Dan Kagan-Kans described Hossenfelder as part of a genre of "conspiracy physics" YouTubers who portray academic physics as a corrupt establishment.

== Honours ==
- FIAS Award for Innovative Thinking (2019)

== Selected publications ==
- Lost in Math: How Beauty Leads Physics Astray. Basic Books (2018). ISBN 978-0-465-09426-4.
- Existential Physics: A Scientist's Guide to Life's Biggest Questions. Viking (2022). ISBN 978-1-9848-7945-5.
- Hossenfelder, Sabine; Palmer, Tim (6 May 2020). "Rethinking Superdeterminism". Frontiers in Physics. 8 139. arXiv:1912.06462. Bibcode:2020FrP.....8..139P. doi:10.3389/fphy.2020.00139. ISSN 2296-424X.
