= Jácome Armas =

Azorean physicist

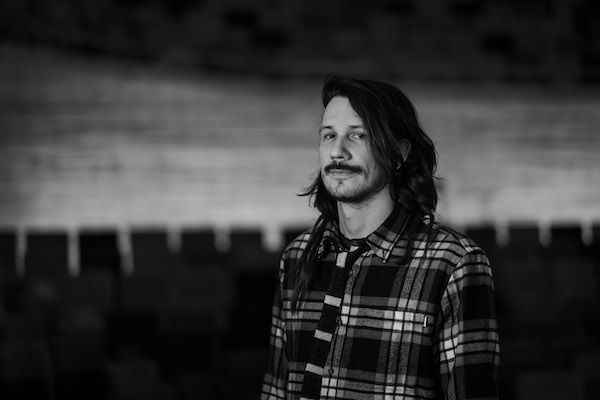
- Jay Armas
- Born: May 29, 1985 (age 41); Azores, Portugal
- Other name: Jay Armas
- Education: University of Aveiro (Licenciatura); University of Cambridge (Part III of the Mathematical Tripos); Niels Bohr Institute (PhD); KU Leuven (BA)
- Scientific career
- Fields: Theoretical physics, String theory, Black holes, Hydrodynamics, Active matter
- Workplaces: University of Amsterdam; Niels Bohr Institute
- Doctoral advisor: N. A. J. Obers
- Website: jacomearmas.org

Jácome "Jay" Armas is an Azorean theoretical physicist, science event producer and science communicator based in Amsterdam and Copenhagen. He is an associate professor at the University of Amsterdam and an affiliate associate professor at the Niels Bohr Institute in Copenhagen. His research spans quantum gravity, higher‑dimensional black holes and branes, holography, and the hydrodynamics of soft and active matter; he has also worked on complex systems. Armas founded the international science series Science & Cocktails and edited the interview volume Conversations on Quantum Gravity (Cambridge University Press, 2021). For his outreach work he received the Genius‑prisen of the Danish Association of Science Journalists (2014) and the 2023 Outreach Prize of the European Physical Society High‑Energy Physics Division.

== Early life and education ==
Armas is from the Azores. Local press in Faial has profiled him as a faialense recognised for achievements in physics and mathematics. He earned a Licenciatura in Engineering Physics from the University of Aveiro (2007), completed Part III of the Mathematical Tripos at the University of Cambridge (2008), received a PhD in theoretical physics from the Niels Bohr Institute (2012), and later a BA in Philosophy from KU Leuven (2017).

== Career and research ==
After his PhD, Armas held postdoctoral positions at the University of Bern (2013–2014) and the Université libre de Bruxelles (2015–2017), before joining the University of Amsterdam in 2018, where he is now associate professor. His research includes work on black‑hole effective theories and horizon geometries, and contributions to modern hydrodynamics, including magnetohydrodynamics, Carrollian fluids and fracton superfluids. He has also co‑authored work on odd viscoelastic responses in active matter, and in social cooperation.

Armas serves as research lead and coordinator of the Dutch Institute for Emergent Phenomena (DIEP), an interdisciplinary hub hosted at the Institute for Advanced Study (IAS) that connects physics, mathematics, chemistry, computer science, logic, ecology to social sciences and economics.

== Outreach and public engagement ==
In 2010 Armas founded Science & Cocktails, a series that blends public science lectures with music/art performances and bespoke cocktails in order to present science in a more informal, less academic way. Originally, the events were formatted much like normal academic talks, and took place in a small cocktail bar run by Armas; since then, they have expanded to much larger events, with music, video, and a party-like atmosphere. The programme now runs in several cities (including Amsterdam, Brussels, Copenhagen and Johannesburg). In recognition of his outreach, Armas received the Genius‑prisen (2014) and the EPS‑HEPP Outreach Prize (2023).

Armas has moderated and participated in public‑science events, including the 2024 CERN panel "The case of the (still) mysterious universe", a public discussion on dark matter, symmetry, string theory and black holes. He has also given public talks, including a 2024 TEDx event in Amsterdam.

== Major projects and grants ==
In November 2024 Armas' consortium Emergence at all Scales was awarded an NWA–ORC grant of €7.1 million by the NWO. The project, coordinated from UvA with partners across Dutch universities, investigates emergence across many orders of magnitude and includes outreach and education components.

== Publications ==
=== Books ===
- Armas, Jácome (Jay), ed. (2021). Conversations on Quantum Gravity. Cambridge: Cambridge University Press. Bibcode:2021cqg..book.....A. doi:10.1017/9781316717639. ISBN 978-1-107-16887-9.

=== Selected papers ===
- Armas, Jay; Jain, Akash (12 April 2019). "Magnetohydrodynamics as Superfluidity". Physical Review Letters. 122 (14) 141603. arXiv:1808.01939. Bibcode:2019PhRvL.122n1603A. doi:10.1103/PhysRevLett.122.141603. PMID 31050455.
- Armas, Jay; Have, Emil (2024). "Carrollian Fluids and Spontaneous Breaking of Boost Symmetry". Physical Review Letters. 132 (16) 161606. arXiv:2308.10594. Bibcode:2024PhRvL.132p1606A. doi:10.1103/PhysRevLett.132.161606. PMID 38701471.
- Armas, Jay; Have, Emil (2024). "Ideal fracton superfluids". SciPost Physics. 16 (1): 039. arXiv:2304.09596. Bibcode:2024ScPP...16...39A. doi:10.21468/SciPostPhys.16.1.039.
- Duclut, Charlie; Bo, Shuangfei; Lier, Ruben; Armas, Jay; Surówka, Paweł; Jülicher, Frank (2024). "Probe particles in odd active viscoelastic fluids: How activity and dissipation determine linear stability". Physical Review E. 109 (4) 044126. arXiv:2310.08640. Bibcode:2024PhRvE.109d4126D. doi:10.1103/PhysRevE.109.044126. PMID 38755925.
- Armas, Jay (2013). "How fluids bend: The elastic expansion for higher-dimensional black holes". Journal of High Energy Physics (9) 73. arXiv:1304.7773. Bibcode:2013JHEP...09..073A. doi:10.1007/JHEP09(2013)073.

== Awards ==
- Outreach Prize, European Physical Society High‑Energy Physics Division (2023).
- Genius‑prisen (Genius Prize) for science communication (2014).
- AJIFA Prémio de Mérito (Faial, 2018).
