= Robert Kraichnan =

American theoretical physicist (1928–2008)

Robert H. Kraichnan
- Born: January 15, 1928; Philadelphia, Pennsylvania, U.S.
- Died: February 26, 2008 (aged 80); Santa Fe, New Mexico, U.S.
- Education: Massachusetts Institute of Technology (B.S. and Ph.D.)
- Known for: Turbulence
- Scientific career
- Fields: Fluid mechanics Field theory (physics)
- Workplaces: Los Alamos National Laboratory, NASA
- Doctoral advisor: Herman Feshbach

Robert Harry Kraichnan (KRAYSH-nan; January 15, 1928 – February 26, 2008), a resident of Santa Fe, New Mexico, was an American theoretical physicist (fluid dynamicist) best known for his work on the theory of fluid turbulence.

== Life ==
Kraichnan received his B.S. and Ph.D. in physics from MIT, graduating in 1949. He became a member of the Institute for Advanced Study in Princeton in 1949/50, and was one of the last assistants to Albert Einstein.

After his appointment at Princeton, he worked in Columbia University and the Courant Institute of Mathematical Sciences at New York University. From 1962 on, he was supported by research grants and worked as a freelance consultant for the Los Alamos National Laboratory, Princeton University, the Office of Naval Research, the Woods Hole Oceanographic Institution and NASA. He had a keen passion for hiking, so he lived in the mountains of New Hampshire and later in White Rock, New Mexico and eventually to Santa Fe, New Mexico near Los Alamos. In 2003, he returned to academia when he was appointed Homewood Professor in the Whiting School of Engineering at Johns Hopkins University, but by this time he had already fallen ill.

He was the recipient of the Lars Onsager Prize and the 1993 Otto Laporte Award of the American Physical Society, and the 2003 Dirac Medal. He was also a member of the National Academy of Sciences.

Kraichnan married twice and has a son, John Kraichnan, by his first wife, Carol Gebhardt. He is also survived by his second wife, Judy Moore-Kraichnan, an artist and photographer who lives in Santa Fe, New Mexico.

== Work ==
In the 1950s, his work was focused on quantum field theory and the quantum mechanical many-body problem, developing starting in 1957 a method for finding a self-consistent formulation for many-body field theories, N-random-coupling-models, in which N copies of a microscopic theory are coupled together in a random way.

Following earlier work of Andrei Kolmogorov (1941), Lars Onsager (1945), Werner Heisenberg (1948), Carl Friedrich von Weizsäcker and others on the statistical theory of turbulence, Kraichnan developed a field-theoretic approach to fluid flow in 1957 derived from approaches to the quantum many-body problem—the Direct Interaction Approximation. In 1964/5, he recast this approach in the Lagrangian picture, discovering a scaling correction which he had earlier incorrectly ignored. The statistical theory of turbulence in viscous liquids describes the fluid flow by a scale-invariant distribution of the velocity field, which means that the typical size of the velocity as a function of wavenumber is a power-law. In steady state, larger scale eddies at long wavelengths disintegrate into smaller ones, dissipating their energy into smaller length scales. This type of dissipation is not caused by friction on the molecular level, but by the nonlinear effects of the Navier–Stokes equations. In the final stages of the energy cascade, at the smallest length scales, the viscosity becomes important and the energy dissipates into heat.

Kraichnan developed his turbulence theories over many decades and was one of the prominent American theorists in this area. From 1967 onwards, he maintained that for two-dimensional turbulence energy does not cascade from large scales (determined by the size of obstacles in the flow) to smaller ones, as it does in three dimensions, but instead cascades from small to large scales. This theory is called the inverse Energy Cascade, and it is especially applicable to oceanography and meteorology, since flows on the surface of the earth are approximately two-dimensional. The theory was tested and confirmed in the 1980s by data gathered from weather balloons.

Also influential was a 1994 paper which presented an exactly solvable turbulence model, now called the Kraichnan model. This model predicts exactly computable anomalous scaling exponents for the advection of a passive scalar field, like the concentration of a dye injected into the fluid which does not diffuse but moves with the fluid along the flow lines.

Even as a high school student, Kraichnan was busily investigating the general theory of relativity, and his research won the prestigious Westinghouse Science Competition for students. He rewrote this work for his Bachelor thesis at MIT in 1947, titled "Quantum Theory of the Linear Gravitational Field". Following an approach that was echoed by Suraj N. Gupta, Richard Feynman and Steven Weinberg, Kraichnan showed that, under some mild secondary assumptions, the full nonlinear equations of general relativity follow from its linearized form: the quantum field theory of a massless spin-2 particle, the graviton, coupled to the stress-energy tensor. The full nonlinear equations emerge when the energy-momentum of the gravitons themselves are included in the stress-energy tensor in a unique self-consistent way.
