= Suraj N. Gupta =

Indian-American physicist (1924–2021)

Suraj Narayan Gupta (1 December 1924 – 4 July 2021) was an Indian-born American theoretical physicist, notable for his contributions to quantum field theory.

== Early life and career ==
S. N. Gupta was born on 1 December 1924 in Punjab, British India. He received his M.Sc. from St. Stephen's College, Delhi, and a Ph.D. from the University of Cambridge, and worked at the Dublin Institute for Advanced Studies from 1948 to 1949. From 1951 to 1953 he served as ICI Fellow at the University of Manchester. In 1953 S. N. Gupta joined as a visiting professor at Purdue University and remained there until 1956. From 1956, he served as a professor at Wayne State University in Detroit, where he was a Distinguished Professor of Physics (Emeritus).

== Work ==
S. N. Gupta introduced in 1950, simultaneously and independently of Konrad Bleuler, the Gupta–Bleuler quantization of the quantum electrodynamics (QED), that takes the covariant Lorenz gauge condition on an indefinite metric in Hilbert space of states realized. From it came some of the first attempts, to derive the equations of general relativity from quantum field theory for a massless spin-2 particle (graviton). Similar work has also led Robert Kraichnan in the 1940s (not published until 1955) and later in the 1960s, by Richard Feynman and Steven Weinberg. Later he worked in various areas of quantum field theory and elementary particle physics, including quantum chromodynamics and quarkonium.

=== Notable works and contributions ===
- Gupta, S. N. (1952). Quantization of Einstein's gravitational field: Linear approximation. Proceedings of the Physical Society. Section A, 65(3), 161–169.
- Gupta, S. N. (1952). Quantization of Einstein's gravitational field: General treatment. Proceedings of the Physical Society. Section A, 65(8), 608–619.
- Barua, D. & Gupta, S. N. (1977). Magnetic and quadrupole moments of the W boson. Physical Review D, 15(2), 509.
- Gupta, S. N., & Radford, S. F. (1985). Quark confinement in quantum chromodynamics. Physical Review D, 32(3), 781.
- Gupta, S. N., Radford, S. F., & Repko, W. W. (1985). (A comment on) Spin-dependent forces in heavy-quark systems. Physical Review Letters, 55(27), 3006.
- Gupta, S. N., Johnson, J. M., & Repko, W. W. (1996). Relativistic two-photon and two-gluon decay rates of heavy quarkonia. Physical Review D, 54(3), 2075.
- Gupta, S. N., Johnson, J. M., Ladinsky, G. A., & Repko, W. W. (1996). Gauge-boson scattering signals at the CERN LHC. Physical Review D, 53(9), 4897.

== Personal life and death ==
Gupta later resided in Franklin, Michigan. He died in West Bloomfield, Michigan, United States of America on 4 July 2021, at the age of 96.
