= Anette Hosoi =

American mechanical engineer, biophysicist

Anette E. "Peko" Hosoi
- Education: Princeton University; University of Chicago
- Awards: Fellow of APS
- Scientific career
- Fields: mechanical engineering; biophysics; mathematics
- Workplaces: Harvey Mudd College; Massachusetts Institute of Technology
- Thesis: Reduced Dimension Models for Various Hydrodynamic Systems (1997)
- Doctoral advisors: Todd F. Dupont; Leo Kadanoff
- Website: hosoigroup.wordpress.com

Anette E. "Peko" Hosoi is an American mechanical engineer, biophysicist, and mathematician, currently the Neil and Jane Pappalardo Professor of Mechanical Engineering and associate dean of engineering at the Massachusetts Institute of Technology.

== Contributions ==
Hosoi's research interests include fluid dynamics, unconventional robotics, and bio-inspired design. One of her projects developed a robot that moved like a snail by extruding artificial snail slime and rippling over it. She has also studied how razor clams turn sand into quicksand while digging themselves in, and designed wetsuits using materials that mimic the thermal insulation properties of otter fur. She is the founder of a sports engineering program at MIT, which she started in 2011 after frustration at the performance of her cross-country bicycle on a downhill bicycling course.

== Early life, education, and career ==
Hosoi was given her nickname "Peko" by her Japanese grandmother, because of her resemblance to Peko-chan, a girl depicted on the packaging for Fujiya Japanese candy. She studied physics at Princeton University and completed her doctorate in physics at the University of Chicago in 1997, under the joint supervision of Todd F. Dupont and Leo Kadanoff.

She came to MIT in 1997 as an instructor of mathematics. After postdoctoral studies at the Courant Institute of Mathematical Sciences and taking as a position as an assistant professor of mathematics at Harvey Mudd College in 2001, she returned to MIT as a regular-ranks faculty member in 2002. She has held a joint appointment in the mathematics department at MIT since 2010. At MIT, she has also been involved in mentorship of women in engineering, and became the first woman there to be given an associate chair position in mechanical engineering.

Anette also appeared in two episodes of Fetch! With Ruff Ruffman; "Gearing Up for Getting Ruff's Goat", and "Eureka is Not a Brand of Dog Food".

== Awards and honors ==
In 2012 Hosoi became a fellow of the American Physical Society "for her innovative work in thin fluid films and in the study of nonlinear interactions between viscous fluids and deformable interfaces including shape, kinematic and rheological optimization in biological systems". She delivered the G.K. Batchelor Lecture for 2009 on "Optimizing Low Reynolds Number Locomotion". She is the recipient of the 2018 Stanley Corrsin Award from the American Physical Society, which recognizes a particularly influential contribution to fundamental fluid dynamics, for her work on nectar-eating bats. In 2023, Hosoi received MIT's Earll M. Murman Award for Excellence in Undergraduate Advising.
