= Ashvin Vishwanath =

Indian-American theoretical physicist (born 1973)

- Born: January 9, 1973 (age 53)
- Occupations: Theoretical physicist; professor

Academic background
- Education: Indian Institute of Technology Kanpur; Princeton University (Ph.D.)

Ashvin Vishwanath (born January 9, 1973) is an Indian-American theoretical physicist known for important contributions to condensed matter physics. He is a professor of physics at Harvard University.

Vishwanath was elected as a member of the American Academy of Arts and Sciences in 2021.

== Education and career ==
Vishwanath holds an undergraduate degree from Indian Institute of Technology Kanpur, completed in 1996. He received his Ph.D. in physics from Princeton University in 2001, after completing a doctoral dissertation, titled "Vortices, quasiparticles and unconventional superconductivity", under the supervision of F. Duncan Haldane. Between 2001 and 2004 he was a Pappalardo fellow at MIT, where his collaborators included T. Senthil and Subir Sachdev. He joined the physics faculty at University of California, Berkeley in 2004 and moved to Harvard University in 2016. He held a Distinguished Visiting Research Chair at the Perimeter Institute for Theoretical Physics from 2012 to 2015 and was awarded the Guggenheim Fellowship in materials science in 2014. He is one of the recipients of the 2016 EPS Europhysics Prize in condensed matter physics for theoretical studies on magnetic skyrmion phases in MnSi, a new phase of matter. He is one of the recipients of the 2024 Oliver E. Buckley Prize for groundbreaking theoretical and experimental studies on the collective electronic properties of materials that reflect topological aspects of their band structure. He is also a fellow of the American Physical Society.

== Research ==
Vishwanath has made important contributions to several areas in condensed matter physics. In particular, his most important contributions have been in deconfined quantum criticality (with T. Senthil, Matthew P. A. Fisher, Subir Sachdev and Leon Balents), Dirac and Weyl semimetals, iron-based high-temperature superconductors, magnetic skyrmion phases, and topological insulators where, in particular and more recently, he has explored several aspects and field theories of symmetry protected topological phases and Floquet topological phases. He has also done important works on quantum magnetic systems and quantum entanglement properties of spin liquids and related topological orders.
