= Existential Physics =

2022 book by Sabine Hossenfelder

Existential Physics: A Scientist's Guide to Life's Biggest Questions
- Author: Sabine Hossenfelder
- Subject: Physics, existentialism, philosophy
- Publisher: Viking Press
- Publication date: August 9, 2022
- Publication place: United States
- Pages: 272
- ISBN: 9781984879455
- Website: https://existentialphysics.com/

Existential Physics: A Scientist's Guide to Life's Biggest Questions is a nonfiction popular science book by theoretical physicist Sabine Hossenfelder that was published by Viking Press on August 9, 2022. It focuses on discussing various existential and ethical questions related to scientific topics and explaining their connection to current scientific research, or debunking their candidacy to be explained by science. These questions are split into individual chapters and interviews with various scientists are included throughout the book.

== Content ==
Each chapter of the book tackles a different scientific or "ascientific" topic, moving between philosophical scientific subjects including predictability, the meaning of life, and the existence of free will to those Hossenfelder considers impossible to be answered by science, such as the existence of God, the multiverse, and the "belief that subatomic particles are conscious". The chapters are interspersed with four interviews with scientists in various physics fields, who offer their own perspective and "stereotypes of eccentricity" to the subject matter.

The book begins with a preface that contains a mental health warning due to the content challenging personal beliefs of readers, with Hossenfelder describing herself as an "agnostic heathen". This notice also includes statements that some spiritual beliefs work with our current understanding of physics and are unaffected by such research, with some few actually supporting our collective knowledge on the subject. The second chapter discusses how the universe started and what the result will entail, serving as an overall breakdown of the history of cosmology. The third chapter examines the second law of thermodynamics, time, and entropy in the concept of why we get older instead of younger.

Several chapters, including four, six, and nine, revolve around the issue of free will and what exactly consciousness is, also including reductionism and determinism. Chapter five attempts to tackle the many-worlds interpretation and whether science can even address the subject. An epilogue is included that concludes with the question "Is the universe made for us" and a discussion of the anthropic principle and how physics observations might bias our understanding of life's existence.

== Critical reception ==
Writing for the Wall Street Journal, Julian Baggini said that the book is an "informed and entertaining guide to what science can and cannot tell us" and that while Hossenfelder may be "too opinionated" at points, the reader "will quickly forgive her" since trying to combine the "concerns of the human world and the baffling complexities of physics" has given her the right to be so. In considering the book's focus on "separating reality from nonsense", Kirkus Reviews says the work contains "highly opinionated and convincing arguments" and calls it a companion book to David Deutsch's The Beginning of Infinity. Library Journal reviewer Catherine Lantz recommended the book for explaining the "questions that current science can and can't answer" and that those wanting to know more about the philosophy of science should read it.

Bethanne Patrick in the Los Angeles Times called Existential Physics the "most entertaining book" of the month and recommended that readers have an "open mind" and "enjoy the ride". Science's Lisa Aziz-Zadeh noted that the book is the "perfect place" to begin questioning and understanding "life's big questions from a physics perspective", but did wish that perspectives from additional fields of study had been included. Felix Haas in World Literature Today complimented the book, saying that it "further establishes its author as a beacon of clarity and sanity" and that it acts as an "invaluable resource" for those that wish to learn about how fundamental physics can "contribute to answering the most fundamental questions of our ontology".

Physics World editor Hamish Johnston pointed out that while some scientists might be concerned at the book potentially emboldening doubters of the scientific method, Hossenfelder's desire to offer a "better understanding of the limitations of science" is provided "loud and clear" and made them "think about the scientific method and the big questions in life". In the journal Physics Education, Rick Marshall referred to the book as a "personal narrative" that creates a "thought provoking, tantalising and illuminating journey", though wishes that the ideas of belief and faith were not used as synonyms, since "belief is based upon evidence whereas faith can spring from an inner conviction (often held despite evidence to the contrary)". George Kendall in Booklist called the book "spectacular" and a "must-read for all who ponder the purpose of existence".
