= Niels Obers =

Dutch theoretical physicist

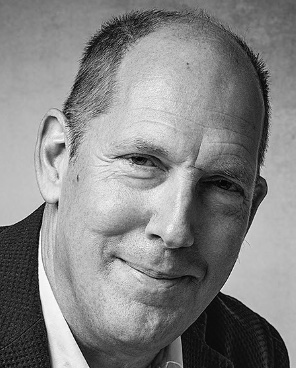
- Niels Obers
- Born: March 22, 1966 (age 60); Nijmegen, Netherlands
- Education: Radboud University Nijmegen; University of California, Berkeley
- Known for: Irrational conformal field theory; U-duality; blackfolds; Newton–Cartan geometry
- Scientific career
- Fields: Theoretical physics; string theory; quantum gravity
- Workplaces: Niels Bohr Institute; Nordita
- Doctoral advisor: M. B. Halpern
- Doctoral students: Jácome Armas

Niels A.J. Obers (born March 22, 1966, Nijmegen, Netherlands) is a Dutch theoretical physicist known for his contributions to conformal field theory, string theory, higher-dimensional black holes and holography. He is a Professor of Theoretical Physics at the Niels Bohr Institute, University of Copenhagen, and was Director of Nordita, the Nordic Institute for Theoretical Physics, from 2019 to 2023.

== Early life and education ==
Obers was born in Nijmegen, Netherlands, and received his undergraduate education in physics at Radboud University Nijmegen, graduating cum laude in 1987. He earned an M.A. in physics in 1989 and completed his Ph.D. in theoretical physics at the University of California, Berkeley in 1991 under the supervision of Martin B. Halpern.

== Academic career ==
After his doctorate, Obers held postdoctoral and research positions at the University of Bonn, École Polytechnique, CERN, and Nordita. From 2000 to 2002, he was an assistant professor at Utrecht University and Amsterdam University. In 2002, he joined the Niels Bohr Institute as an associate professor and was promoted to full professor in 2012. He has chaired the Theoretical Particle Physics and Cosmology section and served as Deputy Head and Acting Head of Department. From 2019 to 2023, Obers served as Director of Nordita.

=== Research ===
Obers is known for his work on irrational conformal field theory, non-perturbative dualities in string theory (notably U-duality), and the dynamics of black holes and black branes via the blackfold approach, as well as for developing non-relativistic gravity, string theory, and holography using Newton–Cartan geometry and related non-Lorentzian structures. His research spans a broad range of topics in theoretical high-energy physics and gravitation.

=== Scientific service and grants ===
Obers has been principal investigator or co-investigator on major national and European research grants and has been representative of Denmark for several EU COST actions. He is a co-principal investigator of the Center of Gravity (CoG), a Danish National Research Foundation Center of Excellence hosted at the Niels Bohr Institute since September 2025.

=== Public engagement ===
Obers is active in science outreach and public communication. He has delivered public lectures on black holes, gravitational waves, and cosmology in Denmark and abroad. He has appeared on Danish television and radio, including DR and TV2, and in several podcasts.

He has written several popular science articles in Danish.

=== Selected publications ===
- M.B. Halpern, E. Kiritsis, N.A. Obers, and K. Clubok, "Irrational Conformal Field Theory," Phys. Rep. 265 (1996) 1–144, arXiv:hep-th/9501144
- N.A. Obers and B. Pioline, "U-duality and M-theory," Phys. Rep. 318 (1999) 113–225, arXiv:hep-th/9809039
- T. Harmark, V. Niarchos, and N.A. Obers, "Instabilities of black strings and branes," Class. Quant. Grav. 24 (2007) R1–R90, arXiv:hep-th/0701022
- D. Hansen, J. Hartong, and N.A. Obers, "Action Principle for Newtonian Gravity," Phys. Rev. Lett. 122 (2019) 061106, arXiv:1807.04765
- J. de Boer, J. Hartong, N.A. Obers, W. Sybesma, and S. Vandoren, "Carroll Symmetry, Dark Energy and Inflation," Front. Phys. 10 (2022) 810405, arXiv:2110.02319

A full list of publications is available via INSPIRE.
