= Sidney Redner =

Canadian physicist

Sidney Redner (born 1951) is a Canadian-born physicist, professor, and a resident faculty member at the Santa Fe Institute. He was formerly department chair of physics at Boston University. Redner has published over 200 journal articles, authored a book titled A Guide to First-Passage Processes (2001, ISBN 0-521-65248-0), and coauthored a book titled A Kinetic View of Statistical Physics (2010, ISBN 978-0-521-85103-9) with Pavel L. Krapivsky and Eli Ben-Naim. His research focuses mainly on non-equilibrium statistical mechanics and network structure. He received his Ph.D. in physics from the Massachusetts Institute of Technology in 1977 under Gene Stanley, also on faculty at Boston University.

He was awarded the American Physical Society's Leo P. Kadanoff Prize for 2021.
