= Alexander V. Balatsky =

American physicist

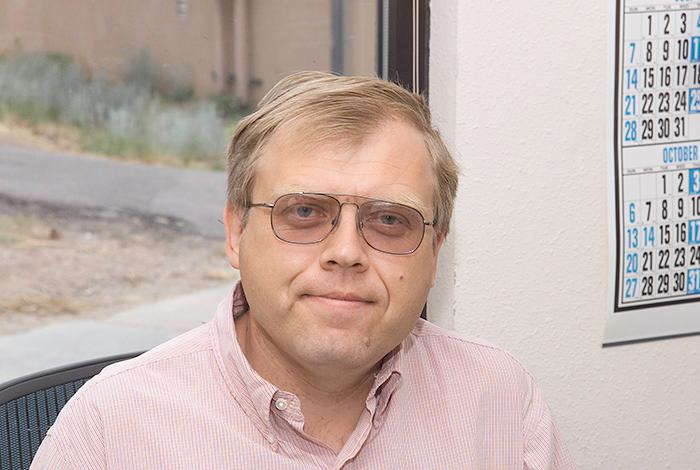
- Balatsky
- Born: 1961 (age 64–65); Pushkin, USSR
- Education: Landau Institute
- Awards: AAAS Fellow, APS Fellow, Los Alamos Fellow
- Scientific career
- Fields: Physics, Condensed Matter Theory
- Workplaces: Los Alamos National Laboratory, NORDITA, KTH Royal Institute of Technology
- Doctoral advisor: M. Feigelman, V.P. Mineev and G.E. Volovik at Landau Institute, David Pines at UIUC

Alexander V. Balatsky (born 19 October 1961) is a USSR-born American physicist. He is the professor of theoretical physics at NORDITA and University of Connecticut. He served as the founding director of the Institute for Materials Science (IMS) at Los Alamos National Laboratory in 2014–2017.

== Biography ==
Born in Pushkin, USSR he was educated in Ukraine and Russia, he received a Master of Science degree at Moscow Physical-Technology Institute in 1984 and Doctor of Philosophy at the Landau Institute for Theoretical Physics in 1987. He moved to the United States in 1989 as a postdoctoral fellow at the University of Illinois in 1989–1990 after which he was appointed a research assistant professor position at the University of Illinois at Urbana Champaign. He then moved to Los Alamos National Laboratory as an Oppenheimer Fellow. As an acting chief scientist and as a theory thrust leader he was actively involved in bringing up the Center of Integrated Nanotechnologies (CINT) and building an active theory program at CINT.

In 2011 Balatsky was appointed as a professor of theoretical condensed matter physics at Nordita in Stockholm. In 2014 he returned to the US to become Director of the new Institute for Materials Science at Los Alamos. In 2018 he joined the University of Connecticut as a professor at the Department of Physics.

== Work ==
Balatsky is known for his contributions to the theory of High-temperature superconductivity, and mechanism of superconducting pairing known as Spin Fluctuation Theory.

According to this theory, the pairing wave function of the cuprate HTS should have a d_{x^{2}-y^{2}} symmetry. The same spin fluctuation mechanism is likely responsible for the superconducting pairing in Heavy fermion superconductors and in Fe based superconductors. Balatsky recently worked on anomalous mechanical properties of solid He4 as an alternative explanation of supersolidity seen in torsional oscillator experiments, on theory of Heavy Fermions, and on electronic and structural properties of DNA and Graphene hybrid structures

Balatsky and collaborators predicted the existence of the impurity induced resonances in d-wave superconductors that can serve as markers of unconventional superconductivity, and Impurity-induced states in conventional and unconventional superconductors.

Balatsky is also known for his work on odd-frequency superconductivity, in particular for proposing (with Elihu Abrahams, 1992) a new class of odd-frequency spin-singlet superconductors, Odd-frequency superconductivity concept was introduced in 1974 by Berezinskii in the context of superfluid ³He. The pairing amplitude is an odd function of time, or of frequency. Electrons pair at unequal times rather than at the same instant making odd frequency a dynamical order. It is considered exotic because it is so rare in nature: no bulk odd-frequency superconductor has been confirmed yet. There are, however, many proposals for engineering odd-frequency pairing in specific systems, such as superconductor–ferromagnet heterostructures and setups that host Majorana modes. Odd frequency pairing concept was extended also to an eightford classification.

Balatsky, in collaboration with Nagaosa and Katsura, has proposed the mechanism for the ferroelectric polarization in the noncollinear spin structures, the so called inverse Dzyaloshinsky-Morya effect or KNB mechanism

He also proposed the notion of Dirac Materials as a unifying class of materials that exhibit Dirac like excitations.

== Honors and awards ==
He was elected as a Fellow of the American Physical Society in 2003, and Los Alamos Fellow in 2005. In Nov 2011, he was elected a fellow of the American Association for the Advancement of Science Fellow
