= B. Sriram Shastry =

American physicist

- Born: November 26, 1950 (age 75); Akola, India
- Citizenship: India * United States
- Education: Nagpur University (B.Sc.); IIT Madras (M.Sc.); Tata Institute of Fundamental Research (Ph.D.)
- Known for: Strongly-correlated Fermi systems, quantum integrable systems, statistical mechanics
- Awards: TWAS Physics Prize (1998); Lars Onsager Prize (2009)
- Honors: Fellow of the Indian Academy of Sciences (1988); Fellow of the Indian National Science Academy (1999); Fellow of TWAS (2000); Fellow of the American Physical Society (2006); Fellow of the National Academy of Sciences, India
- Scientific career
- Fields: Condensed matter physics
- Workplaces: University of Hyderabad; Tata Institute of Fundamental Research; Bell Labs; Indian Institute of Science; University of California, Santa Cruz
- Doctoral advisor: Chanchal Kumar Majumdar

Balajapalli Sriram Shastry (born 26 November 1950 in Akola, India) is an Indian-American condensed matter physicist, specializing in strongly-correlated Fermi systems, quantum integrable systems, and statistical mechanics.

== Biography ==
B. Sriram Shastry graduated in 1968 with a B.Sc. from Nagpur University and in 1970 with an M.Sc. in physics from Indian Institute of Technology Madras (IIT Madras). He received his Ph.D. in 1976 from Mumbai's Tata Institute of Fundamental Research (T.I.F.R.), where he worked with Chanchal Kumar Majumdar. Shastry's doctoral dissertation, entitled Studies in the Magnetic Properties of C.P.C. and Nickel, dealt with "itinerant magnetism and quantum systems in low dimensions". After completing his Ph.D., he was a lecturer in physics at the University of Hyderabad. As a postdoc he worked in 1979 at Imperial College, London and from 1980 to 1982 at the University of Utah, where he worked with T. Bill Sutherland on solvable models. From 1982 to 1987 Shastry worked in India at T.I.F.R. on magnetism of metals and the integrability of the 1-dimensional Hubbard model. At Princeton University he was a visiting faculty member from 1987 to 1988 and from 2000 to 2001. At Bell Laboratories from 1988 to 1994 his research included nuclear magnetic relaxation and Raman scattering in high-T_{c} systems. From 1994 to 2003 at the Indian Institute of Science (I.I.Sc.), he was a professor working on spin ice and superconductivity from repulsive models. Since 2003 he is a professor at the University of California, Santa Cruz.

B. Sriram Shastry was elected in 1988 a Fellow of the Indian Academy of Sciences, in 1999 a Fellow of the Indian National Science Academy, in 2000 a Fellow of The World Academy of Sciences (TWAS), and in 2006 a Fellow of the American Physical Society. He is a Fellow of the National Academy of Sciences, India. He received the 1998 TWAS award in physics. In 2009 he received the Lars Onsager Prize for "pioneering work in developing and solving models of strongly correlated systems and for wide-ranging contributions to phenomenological many-body theory, which have advanced the analysis of experiments on strongly correlated materials." Since 2011 he is on the scientific advisory board of the Max Planck Institute for Complex Systems in Dresden.

He is married and has two sons.
