= Daniel S. Fisher =

American theoretical physicist

Daniel S. Fisher (born November 21, 1956) is an American theoretical physicist working in statistical physics.

== Biography ==
Daniel Fisher graduated from Cornell University with a bachelor's degree in mathematics and physics in 1975 and from Harvard University with a master's degree in physics in 1978 and a doctorate in physics in 1979 working with Bertrand Halperin. He then worked in the theoretical department at Bell Labs until 1987. In 1987 he became a professor of physics at Princeton University and in 1990 at Harvard. In 2005 he moved to Stanford University as a professor of applied physics.

Fisher initially focused on dynamics and phase transitions in disordered systems (such as glasses) and quantum dissipation in superconductors. More recently, he switched to biophysics with a wide range of research topics (including information processing in the brain, physics of biological macromolecules, and evolutionary and population dynamics).

He has been a Fellow of the American Physical Society since 1986. He was a Sloan Research Fellow from 1988 to 1992. He was elected to the American Academy of Arts and Sciences in 1999 and the National Academy of Sciences in 2015. He received the Lars Onsager Prize in 2013.

He is a son of Michael E. Fisher and brother of Matthew P. A. Fisher.

== Selected works ==
- Desai, Michael M; Fisher, Daniel S; Murray, Andrew W (March 2007). "The speed of evolution and maintenance of variation in asexual populations". Curr. Biol. 17 (5): 385–394. Bibcode:2007CBio...17..385D. doi:10.1016/j.cub.2007.01.072. PMC 2987722. PMID 17331728.
- Desai, Michael M; Fisher, Daniel S (July 2007). "Beneficial mutation selection balance and the effect of linkage on positive selection". Genetics. 176 (3): 1759–1798. Bibcode:2007Genet.176.1759D. doi:10.1534/genetics.106.067678. PMC 1931526. PMID 17483432.
- Jiang, Ning; Weinstein, Joshua a; Penland, Lolita; White, Richard a; Fisher, Daniel S; Quake, Stephen R (March 2011). "Determinism and stochasticity during maturation of the zebrafish antibody repertoire". Proc. Natl. Acad. Sci. U.S.A. 108 (13): 5348–5353. Bibcode:2011PNAS..108.5348J. doi:10.1073/pnas.1014277108. PMC 3069157. PMID 21393572.
- Fisher, Daniel S (January 2013). "Asexual evolution waves: fluctuations and universality". J. Stat. Mech.: Theory Exp. 2013 (1) P01011. arXiv:1210.6295. Bibcode:2013JSMTE..01..011F. doi:10.1088/1742-5468/2013/01/P01011. S2CID 18826812.
- Fisher, Daniel S; Hallatschek, Oskar; Fisher, Daniel S (2013). "The acceleration of evolutionary spread by long-range dispersal". Proc. Natl. Acad. Sci. U.S.A. 111 (46): E4911–E4919. doi:10.1073/pnas.1404663111. PMC 4246332. PMID 25368183.
- Desai, Michael M; Walczak, Aleksandra M; Fisher, Daniel S (February 2013). "Genetic diversity and the structure of genealogies in rapidly adapting populations". Genetics. 193 (2): 565–585. doi:10.1534/genetics.112.147157. PMC 3567745. PMID 23222656.
- Callahan, Benjamin J; Fukami, Tadashi; Fisher, Daniel S (2014). "Rapid Evolution of Adaptive Niche Construction in Experimental Microbial Populations". Evolution. 68 (11): 3307–3316. Bibcode:2014Evolu..68.3307C. doi:10.1111/evo.12512. PMID 25138718. S2CID 19690254.
- Rosen, Michael J; Davison, Michelle; Bhaya, Devaki; Fisher, Daniel S (2015). "Fine-scale diversity and extensive recombination in a quasisexual bacterial population occupying a broad niche". Science. 348 (6238): 1019–1023. Bibcode:2015Sci...348.1019R. doi:10.1126/science.aaa4456. PMID 26023139. S2CID 206634491.
- Levy, Sasha F; Blundell, Jamie R; Venkataram, Sandeep; Petrov, Dmitri A; Fisher, Daniel S; Sherlock, Gavin (March 2015). "Quantitative evolutionary dynamics using high-resolution lineage tracking". Nature. 519 (7542): 181–186. Bibcode:2015Natur.519..181L. doi:10.1038/nature14279. PMC 4426284. PMID 25731169.
- Abbott, B P; Abbott, R; Abbott, T D; Abernathy, M R; Acernese, F; Ackley, K; Adams, C; Adams, T; Addesso, P; Adhikari, R X (February 2016). "Observation of Gravitational Waves from a Binary Black Hole Merger". Phys. Rev. Lett. 116 (6) 061102. arXiv:1602.03837. Bibcode:2016PhRvL.116f1102A. doi:10.1103/PhysRevLett.116.061102. PMID 26918975. S2CID 124959784.
- Venkataram, Sandeep; Dunn, Barbara; Li, Yuping; Agarwala, Atish; Chang, Jessica; Ebel, Emily R; Geiler-Samerotte, Kerry; Hérissant, Lucas; Blundell, Jamie R; Levy, Sasha F (September 2016). "Development of a Comprehensive Genotype-to-Fitness Map of Adaptation-Driving Mutations in Yeast". Cell. 166 (6): 1585–1596.e22. Bibcode:2016Cell..166.1585V. doi:10.1016/j.cell.2016.08.002. PMC 5070919. PMID 27594428.
- Pearce, Michael T; Fisher, Daniel S (December 2017). "Rapid adaptation in large populations with very rare sex: Scalings and spontaneous oscillations". Theor. Popul. Biol. 129: 18–40. doi:10.1016/j.tpb.2017.11.005. PMID 29246459. S2CID 35806676.
- Pearce, Michael; Agarwala, Atish; Fisher, Daniel S (2019). "Stabilization of extensive fine-scale diversity by spatio-temporal chaos". bioRxiv 10.1101/736215.
- Watson, Caroline J; Papula, Alana; Poon, Yeuk P G; Wong, Wing H; Young, Andrew L; Druley, Todd E; Fisher, Daniel S; Blundell, Jamie R (2019). "The evolutionary dynamics and fitness landscape of clonal haematopoiesis". bioRxiv 10.1101/569566.
- Blundell, Jamie R; Schwartz, Katja; Francois, Danielle; Fisher, Daniel S; Sherlock, Gavin; Levy, Sasha F (February 2019). "The dynamics of adaptive genetic diversity during the early stages of clonal evolution". Nature Ecology & Evolution. 3 (2): 293–301. doi:10.1038/s41559-018-0758-1. PMC 6517070. PMID 30598529.
- Watson, Caroline J; Papula, A L; Poon, Gladys Y P; Wong, Wing H; Young, Andrew L; Druley, Todd E; Fisher, Daniel S; Blundell, Jamie R (March 2020). "The evolutionary dynamics and fitness landscape of clonal hematopoiesis". Science. 367 (6485): 1449–1454. Bibcode:2020Sci...367.1449W. doi:10.1126/science.aay9333. PMID 32217721. S2CID 214671176.
- Tikhonov, Mikhail; Kachru, Shamit; Fisher, Daniel S (2020). "A model for the interplay between plastic tradeoffs and evolution in changing environments". Proceedings of the National Academy of Sciences. 117 (16): 8934–8940. Bibcode:2020PNAS..117.8934T. bioRxiv 10.1101/711531. doi:10.1073/pnas.1915537117. PMC 7183197. PMID 32245811.
