= Konrad Bleuler =

Swiss physicist (1912–1992)

Konrad Bleuler (German: [ˈblɔɪlər]; 23 September 1912, Herzogenbuchsee – 1 January 1992, Königswinter) was a Swiss physicist who worked in the field of theoretical particle physics and quantum field theory. He is known for his work on the quantisation of the photon, the Gupta–Bleuler formalism.

== Education and career ==
Bleuler was born in Herzogenbuchsee, Switzerland on 23 September 1912. He received his doctorate for the mathematical work titled "On the Rolle's theorem for the operator Δu + λu and related properties of the Green's function" from the ETH Zurich in 1942. His thesis advisor was Michel Plancherel. From 1960 to 1980 he was a professor at the University of Bonn, where he founded the Institute of Theoretical Nuclear Physics, which is now the Helmholtz Institute for Radiation and Nuclear Physics. Even after his retirement, he was active and remained there until his death.

1971 Bleuler organized the first "International Conference on Differential Geometric Methods in Theoretical Physics" and since then he had been organizing the conference regularly. The last one was the 19th Conference in 1990 held at Rapallo. In 1993, at the 22nd Conference in his honor a "Bleuler Medal" awarded.

== Scientific works ==
Bleuler's most notable contribution was the introduction of Gupta–Bleuler formalism for the quantization of the electromagnetic field, which he developed independently of Suraj N. Gupta. This was an important work on quantum electrodynamics. Bleuler also made contributions to nuclear and particle physics. He also wrote about the work of other famous scientists, so on Wolfgang Pauli and Rolf Nevanlinna.
