= Jorge V. José =

Mexican-American physicist

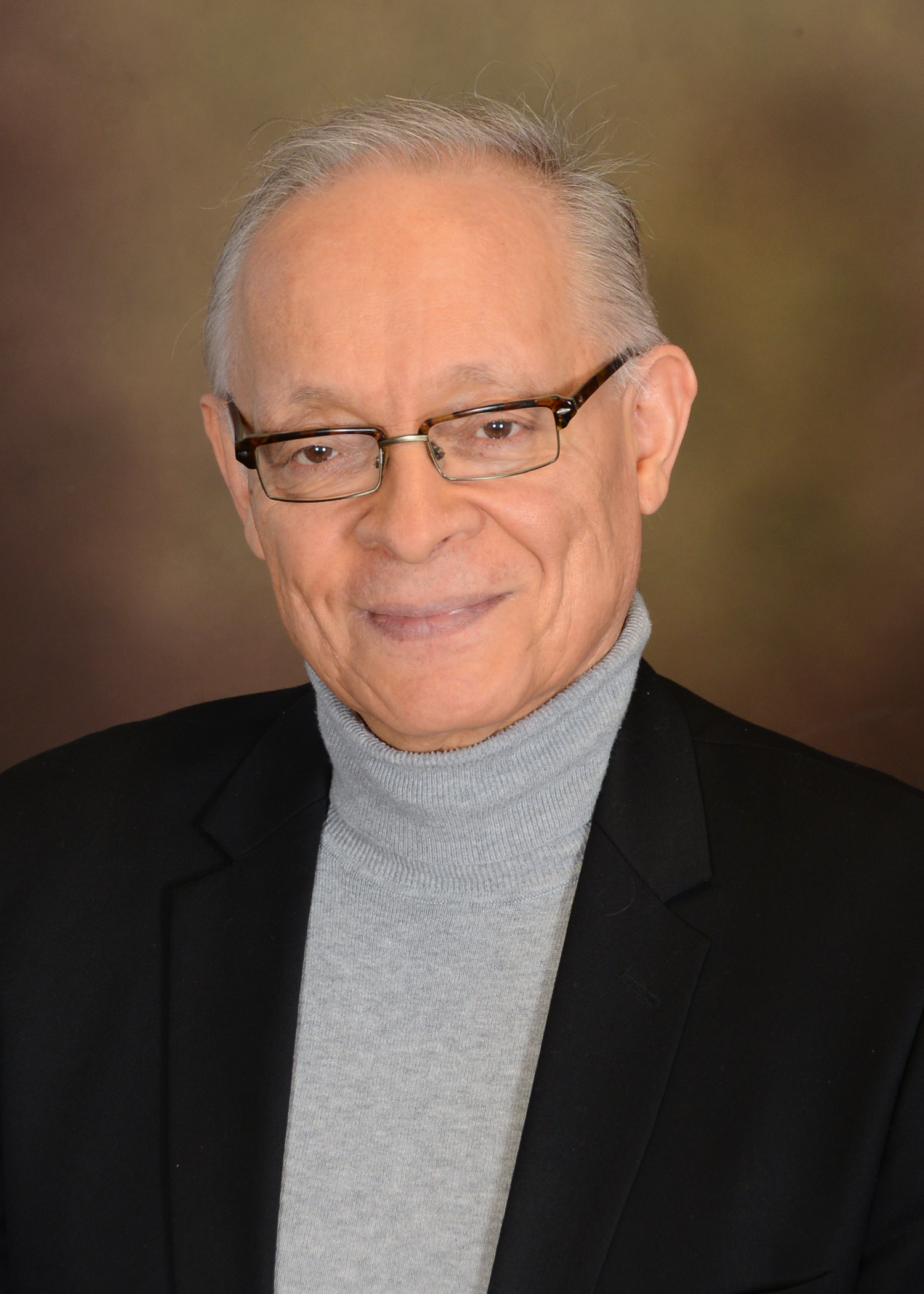
- Born: Jorge José-Valenzuela; Mexico City, Mexico
- Education: National Autonomous University of Mexico (B.Sc 1971); National Autonomous University of Mexico (Doctor of Science 1976)
- Scientific career
- Fields: Theoretical physics, Computational neuroscience and Psychiatry
- Workplaces: National Autonomous University of Mexico (UNAM); Brown University; University of Chicago; Rutgers University; Northeastern University; Institut Laue–Langevin; University at Buffalo, SUNY; Indiana University
- Doctoral advisor: Leo P. Kadanoff

Jorge Valenzuela José is a Mexican/American physicist born in Mexico City. Currently the James H. Rudy Distinguished Professor of Physics at Indiana University. He has made seminal contributions to research in a variety of disciplines, including condensed matter physics, nonlinear dynamics, quantum chaos, biological physics, computational neuroscience and lately precision psychiatry. His pioneering work on the two-dimensional x-y model has been exceedingly influential in many areas of physics and has garnered many citations. He edited the book 40 Years of Berezinskii-Kosterlitz-Thouless Theory, about two-dimensional topological phase transitions, in 2013. Three years later KT were awarded the 2016 Nobel Physics Prize.

== Life and career ==
José was born in Mexico City. He studied physics at the National University of Mexico. He finished his undergraduate degree in two and a half years, including an undergraduate thesis. He did his Ph.D. thesis under the advice of Leo P. Kadanoff at Brown University within a couple of years. Kadanoff hired him as a postdoctoral fellow thereafter during which time they wrote the ‘JKKN’ paper together with Scott Kirkpatrick and David Nelson. The paper provided a theoretical foundation and extensions of the Berezinskii-Kosterlitz-Thouless (BKT) theory.

After Brown University he was at the University of Chicago (1977–1979) as the first James Frank fellow. At Rutgers University he was a Research Assistant Professor for a year in the group of Elihu Abrahams. He joined the Northeastern University faculty where he was promoted from Assistant (1980–84), Associate (1984–88) to Full professor (1988–1994). He was then the Mathews University Distinguished Professor (1996–2007). In 1995 he was the founder and director of the Center for Interdisciplinary Research on Complex Systems (CIRCS) at Northeastern (1995–2015). From 2005 to 2010 he was the Vice President for Research of the System University of New York at Buffalo and a professor of Physics and Biophysics. From 2010 to 2016 he was the System Vice President for Research of Indiana University, being a member of the Physics Department in Bloomington and of the Stark Neuroscience Institute plus adjunct professor of Cellular & Integrative Physiology, at Indiana University School of Medicine, in Indianapolis.

He has been a visiting Professor at: The Laue-Langevin Institute, Grenoble, France (1984–1985): The Saclay Nuclear Research Centre, Paris, (1985): The Center for Theoretical Physics, University of Utrecht, the Netherlands (1994–1995): The Salk Institute for Biological Sciences (2001, 2016).

== Scientific contributions ==
Apart from the JKKN paper José has published over 225 papers on: 1) Phase Transitions and Critical Phenomena; 2) Quantum and Classical Josephson Junction Arrays; 3) Superconducting Gauge Spin Glasses; 4) Localization in Lower Dimensional Systems; 5) Quantum and Classical Chaos; 6) Nonlinear Dynamics; 7) Solitons; 8) Cell biology models of the formation of the mitotic spindle; 9) Computational Neuroscience; 10) Neurodevelopment Disorders (his recent paper was ranked top 100 out of out of 1627 papers published in neuroscience in Scientific Reports (Nature)); and 11) Precision Psychiatry.

== Books ==
In collaboration with E. Saletan he published a graduate textbook Classical Mechanics: A contemporary approach. The book has been used extensively in graduate programs in the US and around the world. He edited the book 40 Years of Berezinskii-Kosterlitz-Thouless Theory in 2013. As a celebration of the 2016 Nobel Physics Prize he co-organized a meeting in Singapore together with Prof. L. Brink, Prof. J. M. Kosterlitz, Prof. M. Gunn and Prof. K. K. Phua. The proceedings of the meeting were published by World Scientific.

== Honors and awards ==
- James Franck Fellow, James Franck Institute, University of Chicago (1977–1979)
- Fellow, American Physical Society (1997)
- Corresponding Member, Mexican Academy of Sciences (2000–)
- Chercheur Etranger D’Haut Niveau et de Renommée Internationale, From the French Government (2002)
- Fellow American Association for the Advancement of Science (AAAS) (2007–)
- Indiana University Bicentennial Medal (2020)
- Thomas Hart Benton Mural Medallion, Indiana University (2015)
- Member of the Alliance of Distinguished and Titled Professors, IU (2010–)
- Chinese Academy of Sciences President's International Fellowship Initiative Awards, (Beijing, 2016, 2018)
