= Gordon Baym =

American physicist (born 1935)

- Born: July 1, 1935 (age 91); New York City, U.S.
- Education: Cornell University; Harvard University
- Known for: Baym–Kadanoff functional
- Awards: Hans A. Bethe Prize (2002); Lars Onsager Prize (2008); Eugene Feenberg Memorial Medal (2011); APS Medal for Exceptional Achievement in Research (2021)
- Scientific career
- Fields: Physics
- Workplaces: University of Illinois at Urbana-Champaign
- Doctoral advisor: Julian Schwinger
- Doctoral students: Ruben Gerardo Barrera

Gordon Alan Baym (born July 1, 1935) is an American theoretical physicist.

== Biography ==
Born in New York City, he graduated from the Brooklyn Technical High School, and received his undergraduate degree from Cornell University in 1956. He earned his Ph.D. from Harvard University in 1960, studying under Julian Schwinger.

He joined the physics faculty of the University of Illinois at Urbana-Champaign in 1963, becoming a full professor in 1968. His areas of research include condensed-matter physics, nuclear physics and astrophysics, as well as the history of physics.

In 1962 he and Leo Kadanoff collaborated on Quantum Statistical Mechanics: Green's Function Methods in Equilibrium and Nonequilibrium Problems. In 1969 he published Lectures on Quantum Mechanics, a widely used graduate textbook that, unconventionally, begins with photon polarization. In 1991 he and Chris Pethick published the monograph Landau Fermi-Liquid Theory: Concepts and Applications.

Baym was awarded the Hans A. Bethe Prize in 2002 "For his superb synthesis of fundamental concepts which have provided an understanding of matter at extreme conditions, ranging from crusts and interiors of neutron stars to matter at ultrahigh temperature". He also received the Lars Onsager Prize in 2008 "for fundamental applications of statistical physics to quantum fluids, including Fermi liquid theory and ground-state properties of dilute quantum gases, and for bringing a conceptual unity to these areas" along with Christopher Pethick and Tin-Lun Ho.

He has four children, professors of communications Nancy Baym and Geoffrey Baym, mathematician and biologist Michael Baym, and cognitive neuroscientist Carol Baym. He was married from 1958 to 1970 to Nina Baym, a professor of English at the UIUC, and from 1981 to 1992 to Lillian Hoddeson, a professor of history at UIUC.

== Awards and honors ==
- Fellow of the American Academy of Arts and Sciences, 1981
- Member of the National Academy of Sciences, 1982
- Member of the American Philosophical Society, 2000
- Hans A. Bethe Prize, 2002
- Lars Onsager Prize, 2008
- Eugene Feenberg Memorial Medal, 2011
- APS Medal for Exceptional Achievement in Research, 2021
