= Lars Onsager Prize =

Statistical physics award by the American Physics Society

The Lars Onsager Prize is a prize in theoretical statistical physics awarded annually by the American Physical Society. Prize recipients receive a medal, certificate, and $10,000. It was established in 1993 by Drs. Russell and Marian Donnelly in memory of Lars Onsager.

== Recipients ==
| Year | Recipients |
|---|---|
| 1995 | Michael E. Fisher |
| 1997 | Robert Kraichnan |
| 1998 | Leo Kadanoff |
| 1999 | Chen Ning Yang |
| 2000 | David J. Thouless |
| 2000 | John M. Kosterlitz |
| 2001 | Bertrand Halperin |
| 2002 | Anatoly Larkin |
| 2003 | Pierre Hohenberg |
| 2004 | John Cardy |
| 2005 | Valery Pokrovsky |
| 2006 | Rodney Baxter |
| 2007 | A. Brooks Harris |
| 2008 | Christopher Pethick |
| 2008 | Gordon Baym |
| 2008 | Tin-Lun Ho |
| 2009 | B. Sriram Shastry |
| 2010 | Daniel Friedan |
| 2010 | Stephen Shenker |
| 2011 | Alexander Belavin |
| 2011 | Alexander Zamolodchikov |
| 2011 | Alexander Polyakov |
| 2012 | Ian Affleck |
| 2013 | Daniel S. Fisher |
| 2014 | Grigory E. Volovik |
| 2014 | Vladimir P. Mineev |
| 2015 | Franz Wegner |
| 2016 | Marc Mézard |
| 2016 | Giorgio Parisi |
| 2016 | Riccardo Zecchina |
| 2017 | Natan Andrei |
| 2017 | Paul Wiegmann |
| 2018 | Subir Sachdev |
| 2019 | Christopher Jarzynski |
| 2020 | Tamás Vicsek |
| 2020 | Yuhai Tu |
| 2020 | John Toner |
| 2021 | Lev Pitaevskii |
| 2022 | Boris Altshuler |
| 2022 | David A. Huse |
| 2022 | Igor Aleiner |
| 2023 | Peter Hänggi |
| 2024 | Jacques Prost |
| 2025 | Jean-Philippe Bouchaud |
| 2025 | Jorge Kurchan |
| 2025 | Leticia Fernanda Cugliandolo |
| 2026 | Mehran Kardar |
| 2027 | John Chalker |

== See also ==
- List of physics awards
