= Plumber's nightmare =

Specific structure in soft matter physics

In soft matter physics, the plumber's nightmare is a structure characterized by fully connected, periodic, and topologically nontrivial surfaces. It consists of two surfaces, each of which is topologically like the surface of the bars of a jungle gym. These two "jungle gyms" are interwoven. It was predicted decades ago that this structure could be thermodynamically favored under certain circumstances.

In 2003 researchers succeeded in making a plumber's nightmare structure using a block copolymer of polyisoprene and polyethylene oxide mixed with aluminum sec-butoxide and a compound containing silicon. The polyisoprene parts formed the "jungle gym", and upon calcining this left a matrix of aluminosilicate.

The term plumber's nightmare became widely known through a publication by David A. Huse and Stanislas Leibler who attribute the name to Sol Gruner.

== Other uses ==
The Window's 3-D Pipes Screensaver is also known as The Plumber's Nightmare

The Series 'A' Vincent Rapide became known as "The Plumber's Nightmare" due to the mass of external pipework around the engine.
