= Daniel F. Styer =

American theoretical physicist and professor (born 1955)

- Born: 1955 (age 70–71)
- Education: Swarthmore College; Cornell University
- Scientific career
- Fields: Theoretical physics
- Doctoral advisor: Michael E. Fisher

Daniel F. Styer (born 1955) is an American theoretical physicist and distinguished professor of physics at Oberlin College. He is author of several books on theoretical physics.

== Education and career ==
Styer obtained his B.A. from Swarthmore College in 1977, majoring in physics. He obtained his Ph.D. in 1983 from Cornell University on Partial Differential Approximants and Applications to Statistical Mechanics. Subsequently, he worked at Rutgers University until 1985 as postdoctoral fellow. He started working at Oberlin College in the physics department in 1985, became full professor in 1998, and was awarded the John and Marianne Schiffer Professorship in physics in 2007.

He worked as visiting faculty at Case Western Reserve University in fall 1988, and at the University of Colorado, Boulder in fall 1991, and he is a reviewer for numerous physics journals. From 1997 to 1999 he was associate editor of the American Journal of Physics.

== Publications ==
Styer has authored books on relativity theory, statistical mechanics and quantum mechanics, as well as numerous articles in peer-reviewed journals, including scientific articles, book reviews and didactically-oriented articles. He also expanded the book Quantum Mechanics and Path Integrals by Richard P. Feynman and Albert R. Hibbs.

Books:

- D.F. Styer: Invitation to Quantum Mechanics (2022), World Scientific.
- D.F. Styer: Relativity for the Questioning Mind, Johns Hopkins University Press, Baltimore, Maryland, 2011
- D.F. Styer: Statistical Mechanics, Oberlin College, 2007
- D.F. Styer: The Strange World of Quantum Mechanics, Cambridge University Press, Cambridge, U.K., 2000
- J.R. Hiller, I.D. Johnson, D.F. Styer: Quantum Mechanics Simulations, John Wiley & Sons, New York, 1995

He has also published numerous didactically oriented articles in the American Journal of Physics, including:

- Styer, Daniel F. (March 2002). "Nine formulations of quantum mechanics" (PDF). American Journal of Physics. 70 (3): 288–297. doi:10.1119/1.1445404.
