= Boris Altshuler =

American academic

Boris Leonidovich Altshuler
- Борис Леонидович Альтшулер
- Born: 27 January 1955 (age 71); Leningrad, Soviet Union
- Education: University of St. Petersburg; Leningrad Institute for Nuclear Physics
- Awards: Hewlett-Packard Europhysics Prize (1993); Oliver E. Buckley Condensed Matter Prize (2003); Lars Onsager Prize (2022)
- Scientific career
- Fields: Condensed matter physics
- Workplaces: Leningrad Institute for Nuclear Physics; MIT; Princeton; Columbia; Lebedev Physical Institute, Russian Academy of Sciences

Boris Leonidovich Altshuler (Russian: Бори́с Леонидович Альтшу́лер, born 27 January 1955, Leningrad, USSR) is a professor of theoretical physics at Columbia University. His specialty is theoretical condensed matter physics.

== Education and career ==
Altshuler attended State Secondary School 489 in Saint Petersburg. He received his diploma in physics from Leningrad State University in 1976. Altshuler continued on at the Leningrad Institute for Nuclear Physics, where he was awarded his Ph.D. in physics in 1979. Altshuler stayed at the institute for the next ten years as a research fellow.

In 1989, Altshuler joined the faculty of the Massachusetts Institute of Technology. While there, he received the Hewlett-Packard Europhysics Prize (now called the Agilent Physics Prize) and became a fellow of the American Physical Society.

Altshuler left MIT in 1996 to take a professorship at Princeton University. While there, he became affiliated with NEC Laboratories America. Recently, Altshuler has joined the faculty of Columbia and continues to work with the NEC Labs.

== Research ==
Altshuler's contributions to condensed matter physics are broad and manifold. He is particularly famous for his work on disordered electronic systems, where he was the first to calculate singular quantum interference corrections to electron transport due to interactions (Altshuler-Aronov corrections). Together with Aronov, he has also developed theory of dephasing in weak-localization. In collaboration with Boris Shklovskii, Altshuler developed the theory of level repulsion in disordered metals.

He has also significantly contributed to the theory of universal conduction fluctuations. More recently, Altshuler and Igor Aleiner have pioneered the new field of many-body localization, where they showed that an interacting many-body system may remain localized - a phenomenon descending from the famous phenomenon of Anderson localization. The latter achievement of Altshuler and Aleiner is widely regarded as a major milestone and many-body localization, they introduced, has now developed into a flourishing new field of physics. In 2016, the predicted phenomenon of many-body localization was observed experimentally by the group of Immanuel Bloch in Munich, Germany.

== Awards and honors ==
- 1993: Hewlett-Packard Europhysics Prize
- 1993: Became a fellow of the American Physical Society
- 1996: Fellow of the American Academy of Arts and Sciences
- 2002: Elected to the National Academy of Sciences
- 2003: Oliver E. Buckley Prize of the American Physical Society
- Elected to the Norwegian Academy of Science and Letters
- 2017: Dirac Medal for the Advancement of Theoretical Physics, awarded by the University of New South Wales
- 2019: Simons Fellow
- 2022: Lars Onsager Prize of the American Physical Society
