= Christopher J. Pethick =

British theoretical physicist

Christopher John Pethick (born 22 February 1942 in Horsham, UK) is a British theoretical physicist, specializing in many-body theory, ultra-cold atomic gases, and the physics of neutron stars and stellar collapse.

== Education and career ==
Pethick studied at the University of Oxford, where he received his BA in 1962 and his PhD in 1965. He was then a postdoc at Magdalen College, Oxford and at the University of Illinois at Urbana-Champaign, where he was an associate professor from 1970 to 1973, a full professor from 1973 to 1995, and an adjunct professor from 1995 to 1998. For two academic years from 1970 to 1972 he was a Sloan Research Fellow. In 1973 he also became a professor at Nordita and then for many years divided his time between Nordita and the University of Illinois at Urbana-Champaign. He was director of Nordita from 1989 to 1994. He then worked, until his retirement, at the Niels Bohr Institute in Copenhagen (with which Nordita was closely associated before moving to Stockholm). He was for the academic year 1973–1974 a visiting researcher at Moscow's Landau Institute for Theoretical Physics and in 1995 a visiting scientist at the Institute for Nuclear Theory (INT), located in Seattle on the campus of the University of Washington.

In 2008 he was awarded the Lars Onsager Prize for "fundamental applications of statistical physics to quantum fluids, including Fermi liquid theory and ground-state properties of dilute quantum gases, and for bringing a conceptual unity to these areas." (Gordon Baym and Tin-Lun Ho also won the Onsager Prize for 2008.) In 2011 Pethick received the Hans A. Bethe Prize for "fundamental contributions to the understanding of nuclear matter at very high densities, the structure of neutron stars, their cooling, and the related neutrino processes and astrophysical phenomena." In 2015 he was awarded the Feenberg Medal "for his pioneering contributions and profound insights into many-body physics across diverse physical systems, ranging from ultracold atoms and quantum liquids to dense nuclear matter in neutron stars and stellar collapse".

In 2013 he was elected an honorary foreign member of the American Academy of Arts and Sciences. Pethick is since 1977 a member of the Royal Danish Academy of Sciences and Letters and since 2003 a member of the Norwegian Academy of Language and Literature. In 1985 he was elected a Fellow of the American Physical Society for "his extensive contributions to the theory of condensed matter systems, ranging from low temperature helium and superconductors to condensed astrophysical objects and nuclear matter." In 2016 he was elected a member of the American Philosophical Society.

He initiated the tradition of making tea at the Niels Bohr Institute everyday at 15:30 with cake. He is still doing this to this day.

== Selected publications ==
=== Articles ===
- Baym, Gordon; Bethe, Hans A.; Pethick, Christopher J. (1971). "Neutron star matter". Nuclear Physics A. 175 (2): 225–271. Bibcode:1971NuPhA.175..225B. doi:10.1016/0375-9474(71)90281-8.
- Maraschi, L.; Treves, Aldo; Abramowicz, Marek A. (October 1989). Accretion: A Collection of Influential Papers. World Scientific. ISBN 978-981-4522-09-0.
- Ravenhall, D. G.; Pethick, C. J.; Wilson, J. R. (1983). "Structure of Matter below Nuclear Saturation Density". Physical Review Letters. 50 (26): 2066–2069. Bibcode:1983PhRvL..50.2066R. doi:10.1103/PhysRevLett.50.2066.
- Gudmundsson, Einar H.; Pethick, C. J.; Epstein, Richard I. (1983). "Structure of neutron star envelopes". The Astrophysical Journal. 272: 286–300. Bibcode:1983ApJ...272..286G. doi:10.1086/161292.
- Lattimer, J.M.; Pethick, C.J.; Ravenhall, D.G.; Lamb, D.Q. (1985). "Physical properties of hot, dense matter: The general case". Nuclear Physics A. 432 (3): 646–742. Bibcode:1985NuPhA.432..646L. doi:10.1016/0375-9474(85)90006-5.
- Fisk, Z.; Hess, D. W.; Pethick, C. J.; Pines, D.; Smith, J. L.; Thompson, J. D.; Willis, J. O. (1988). "Heavy-Electron Metals: New Highly Correlated States of Matter". Science. 239 (4835): 33–42. Bibcode:1988Sci...239...33F. doi:10.1126/science.239.4835.33. PMID 17820627. S2CID 42287069.
- Baym, Gordon; Monien, H.; Pethick, C. J.; Ravenhall, D. G. (1990). "Transverse interactions and transport in relativistic quark-gluon and electromagnetic plasmas". Physical Review Letters. 64 (16): 1867–1870. Bibcode:1990PhRvL..64.1867B. doi:10.1103/PhysRevLett.64.1867. PMID 10041515.
- Lattimer, James M.; Pethick, C. J.; Prakash, Madappa; Haensel, Pawel (1991). "Direct URCA process in neutron stars". Physical Review Letters. 66 (21): 2701–2704. Bibcode:1991PhRvL..66.2701L. doi:10.1103/PhysRevLett.66.2701. PMID 10043594.
- Pethick, C. J. (1992). "Cooling of neutron stars". Reviews of Modern Physics. 64 (4): 1133–1140. Bibcode:1992RvMP...64.1133P. doi:10.1103/RevModPhys.64.1133.
- Lorenz, C. P.; Ravenhall, D. G.; Pethick, C. J. (1993). "Neutron star crusts". Physical Review Letters. 70 (4): 379–382. Bibcode:1993PhRvL..70..379L. doi:10.1103/PhysRevLett.70.379. PMID 10054097.
- Heiselberg, H.; Pethick, C. J.; Staubo, E. F. (1993). "Quark matter droplets in neutron stars". Physical Review Letters. 70 (10): 1355–1359. Bibcode:1993PhRvL..70.1355H. doi:10.1103/PhysRevLett.70.1355. PMID 10053272.
- Pethick, C. J.; Ravenhall, D. G. (1995). "Matter at Large Neutron Excess and the Physics of Neutron-Star Crusts". Annual Review of Nuclear and Particle Science. 45 (45): 429–484. Bibcode:1995ARNPS..45..429P. doi:10.1146/annurev.ns.45.120195.002241.
- Pethick, C.J.; Ravenhall, D.G.; Lorenz, C.P. (1995). "The inner boundary of a neutron-star crust". Nuclear Physics A. 584 (4): 675–703. Bibcode:1995NuPhA.584..675P. doi:10.1016/0375-9474(94)00506-I.
- Baym, Gordon; Pethick, C. J. (1996). "Ground-State Properties of Magnetically Trapped Bose-Condensed Rubidium Gas". Physical Review Letters. 76 (1): 6–9. arXiv:cond-mat/9508040. Bibcode:1996PhRvL..76....6B. doi:10.1103/PhysRevLett.76.6. PMID 10060420. S2CID 12397716.
- Jackson, A. D.; Kavoulakis, G. M.; Pethick, C. J. (1998). "Solitary waves in clouds of Bose-Einstein condensed atoms". Physical Review A. 58 (3): 2417–2422. arXiv:cond-mat/9803116. Bibcode:1998PhRvA..58.2417J. doi:10.1103/PhysRevA.58.2417. S2CID 119380327.
- Viverit, L.; Pethick, C. J.; Smith, H. (2000). "Zero-temperature phase diagram of binary boson-fermion mixtures". Physical Review A. 61 (5) 053605. arXiv:cond-mat/9911080. Bibcode:2000PhRvA..61e3605V. doi:10.1103/physRevA.61.053605. S2CID 119101699.
- Heiselberg, H.; Pethick, C. J.; Smith, H.; Viverit, L. (2000). "Influence of Induced Interactions on the Superfluid Transition in Dilute Fermi Gases". Physical Review Letters. 85 (12): 2418–2421. arXiv:cond-mat/0004360. Bibcode:2000PhRvL..85.2418H. doi:10.1103/PhysRevLett.85.2418. PMID 10978071. S2CID 5755848.
- Viverit, L.; Pethick, C. J.; Smith, H. (2000). "Zero-temperature phase diagram of binary boson-fermion mixtures". Physical Review A. 61 (5) 053605. arXiv:cond-mat/9911080. Bibcode:2000PhRvA..61e3605V. doi:10.1103/PhysRevA.61.053605. S2CID 119101699.
- Yakovlev, D.G.; Pethick, C.J. (2004). "Neutron Star Cooling". Annual Review of Astronomy and Astrophysics. 42 (1): 169–210. arXiv:astro-ph/0402143. Bibcode:2004ARA&A..42..169Y. doi:10.1146/annurev.astro.42.053102.134013. S2CID 119487671.
- Hebeler, K.; Lattimer, J. M.; Pethick, C. J.; Schwenk, A. (2010). "Constraints on Neutron Star Radii Based on Chiral Effective Field Theory Interactions". Physical Review Letters. 105 (16) 161102. arXiv:1007.1746. Bibcode:2010PhRvL.105p1102H. doi:10.1103/PhysRevLett.105.161102. PMID 21230959. S2CID 7637442.
- Hebeler, K.; Lattimer, J. M.; Pethick, C. J.; Schwenk, A. (2013). "Equation of State and Neutron Star Properties Constrained by Nuclear Physics and Observation". The Astrophysical Journal. 773 (1): 11. arXiv:1303.4662. Bibcode:2013ApJ...773...11H. doi:10.1088/0004-637X/773/1/11. S2CID 119119889.

=== Books ===
- with Gordon Baym: Landau Fermi-Liquid Theory: Concepts and Applications. Wiley. 1991. 2nd edition. John Wiley & Sons. 2008. ISBN 978-3-527-61716-6. ISBN 978-0-471-82418-3
- with H. Smith: Bose-Einstein Condensation in Dilute Gases (1st ed.). Cambridge University Press. 2001. Pethick, C. J.; Smith, H. (2008). 2nd edition. Cambridge University Press. ISBN 978-1-139-81108-8. hbk ISBN 978-0-521-84651-6
