= Nigel Goldenfeld =

British-American physicist (born 1957)

Nigel Goldenfeld FRS
- Born: Nigel David Goldenfeld; May 1, 1957 (age 69); St Pancras, London, England
- Education: University of Cambridge (PhD)
- Awards: Leo P. Kadanoff Prize (2020); Member of the National Academy of Sciences (2010)
- Scientific career
- Fields: Physics; Evolutionary biology
- Workplaces: University of California, San Diego; University of Illinois at Urbana-Champaign
- Thesis: The statistical mechanics of polymer molecules in the solid state. (1982)
- Doctoral advisor: Sam Edwards
- Website: guava.physics.ucsd.edu/~nigel

Nigel David Goldenfeld FRS (born May 1, 1957) is a Professor of Physics at the University of California, San Diego. Previously he worked at the University of Illinois at Urbana-Champaign, where he served as director of the NASA Astrobiology Institute for Universal Biology, and the leader of the Biocomplexity group at Carl R. Woese Institute for Genomic Biology.

== Education ==
Goldenfeld was educated at the University of Cambridge (UK) where received his Ph.D. in 1982.

== Career and research ==
Goldenfeld is a co-founder of Numerix and the author of the 1993 textbook "Lectures on Phase Transitions and the Renormalization Group," a widely used graduate textbook in statistical physics.

He is a Fellow of American Academy of Arts and Sciences and a Fellow of American Physical Society since 1995 and a Fellow of the Royal Society (FRS) since 2024.
