= Andrea Liu =

Professor of Physics

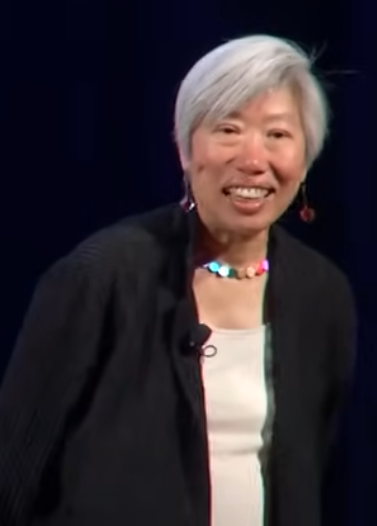
- Giving the 2024 Oppenheimer Lecture at UC Berkeley
- Born: October 7, 1962 (age 63)
- Education: University of California, Berkeley; Cornell University
- Awards: National Academy of Sciences (2017) Simons Investigator in Theoretical Physics (2015); Simons Fellow (2013); American Association for the Advancement of Science (2012); American Academy of Arts and Sciences (2010) American Physical Society (2004)
- Scientific career
- Fields: Physics; Soft condensed matter
- Workplaces: University of Pennsylvania; University of California, Los Angeles
- Thesis: Criticality in bulk and semi-infinite systems (1989)
- Doctoral advisor: Michael Fisher

Andrea Jo-Wei Liu (born 1962) is the Hepburn Professor of Physics at the University of Pennsylvania, where she holds a joint appointment in the Department of Chemistry. She is a theoretical physicist studying condensed matter physics and biophysics. She is particularly known for her study of jamming, a phenomenon in which disordered materials become rigid with increasing density and stress. She is a Simons Investigator and Simons Fellow in Theoretical Physics, fellow of the American Physical Society (APS), the American Association for the Advancement of Science (AAAS), the American Academy of Arts and Sciences, and a member of the National Academy of Sciences (NAS).

== Academic career ==
Liu graduated from the University of California, Berkeley in 1984, and earned a Ph.D. in 1989 from Cornell University under the supervision of Michael Fisher. After postdoctoral studies at Exxon and the University of California, Santa Barbara, she joined the faculty at the University of California, Los Angeles in 1993, and moved to the University of Pennsylvania in 2004. She became the Edmund J. and Louise W. Kahn Professor in the Natural Sciences in 2009, before becoming the Hepburn Professor in 2011.

Liu was the General Councilor of the American Physical Society (2017-2020). She served on the steering committees for a number of scientific organizations including the APS Board of Directors, the National Science Foundation (NSF) Committee of Visitors for the Division of Materials Research, the NAS Biophysics Decadal Study Committee, and the National Research Council (NRC) Condensed Matter and Materials Research Committee.

== Research contributions ==
Liu is recognized for distinguished contributions in theoretical physics, particularly for demonstrating that slow relaxation in soft materials can be viewed within a common framework called jamming." She was one of the first scientists to uncover the structural and dynamical features of the jamming transition, a critical phase transition that marks the onset of rigidity in disordered packings. She has also resolved a longstanding question of how disordered solids flow by identifying "flow defects", or regions that are vulnerable to local rearrangement, analogous to dislocations in crystals.

According to Google Scholar, Liu's publications have received over 23,000 citations and her h-index is 74.

== Awards and honors ==
Liu has received a significant number of awards and honors which include:

- Election to the National Academy of Sciences (2017)
- Simons Investigator in Theoretical Physics (2015)
- Simons Fellow in Theoretical Physics (2013)
- Fellow, American Association for the Advancement of Science (2012)
- Member of the American Academy of Arts and Sciences (2010)
- Fellow of the American Physical Society (2004)
- UCLA Herbert Newby McCoy Award (2002)
- UCLA Glenn Seaborg Award (2000)
- National Science Foundation CAREER Award (1996)

== Selected publications ==
- Landes, F. P., Biroli G., Dauchot O., Liu, A. J., Reichman, D. R. Attractive versus truncated repulsive supercooled liquids: The dynamics is encoded in the pair correlation function. Physical Review E 101, 010602 (2020). DOI:10.1103/PhysRevE.101.010602
- Sharp, T.A., Thomas S. L., Cubuk, E. D., Schoenholz, S. S., Srolovitz, D. J., Liu. A. J. Machine learning determination of atomic dynamics at grain boundaries. Proceedings of the National Academy of Sciences USA 115(43), 10943 (2018). DOI: 10.1073/pnas.1807176115
- Harris, Tajie H.; Banigan, Edward J.; Christian, David A.; Konradt, Christoph; Tait Wojno, Elia D.; Norose, Kazumi; Wilson, Emma H.; John, Beena; Weninger, Wolfgang; Luster, Andrew D.; Liu, Andrea J.; Hunter, Christopher A. (May 2012), "Generalized Lévy walks and the role of chemokines in migration of effector CD8^{+} T cells", Letters, Nature, 486 (7404): 545–548, Bibcode:2012Natur.486..545H, doi:10.1038/nature11098, PMC 3387349, PMID 22722867.
- O'Hern, Corey S.; Silbert, Leonardo E.; Liu, Andrea J.; Nagel, Sidney R. (July 2003), "Jamming at zero temperature and zero applied stress: The epitome of disorder", Physical Review E, 68 (1) 011306, arXiv:cond-mat/0304421, Bibcode:2003PhRvE..68a1306O, doi:10.1103/PhysRevE.68.011306, PMID 12935136, S2CID 12712397.
- Liu, Andrea J.; Nagel, Sidney R. (November 1998), "Nonlinear dynamics: Jamming is not just cool any more", News and Views, Nature, 396 (6706): 21–22, Bibcode:1998Natur.396...21L, doi:10.1038/23819, S2CID 33422329.
- Liu, Andrea J.; Fisher, Michael E. (March 1989), "The three-dimensional Ising model revisited numerically", Physica A: Statistical Mechanics and its Applications, 156 (1): 35–76, Bibcode:1989PhyA..156...35L, doi:10.1016/0378-4371(89)90109-x.
