= Michael P. Brenner =

American mathematician and physicist

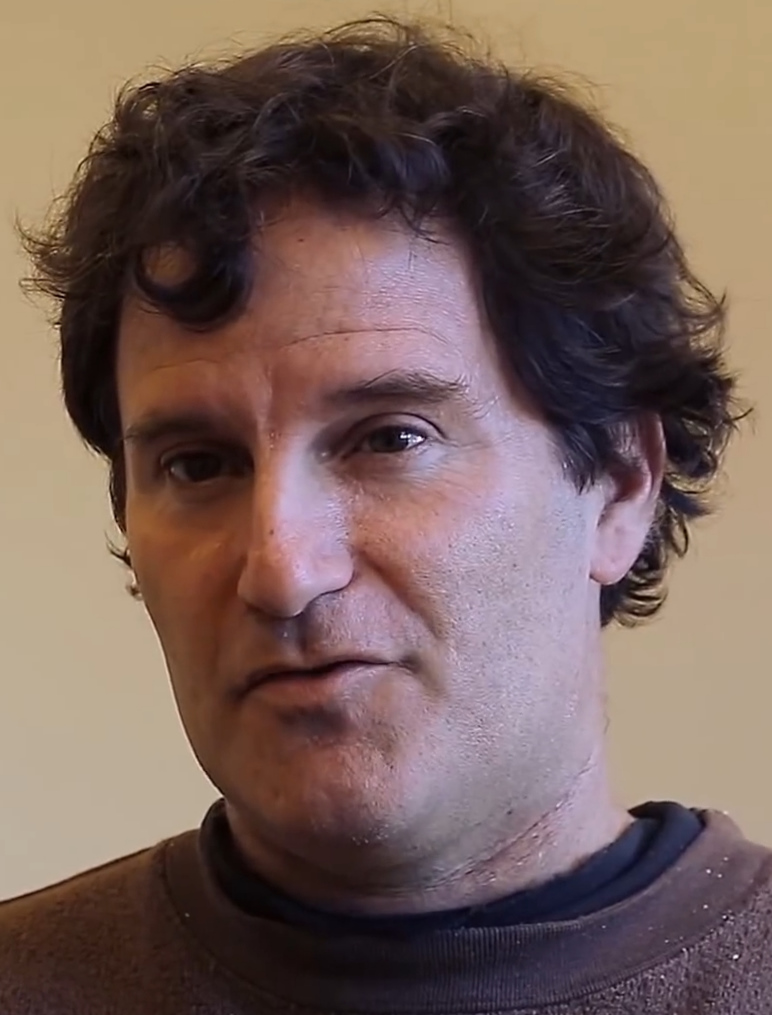
- Michael Brenner in 2014
- Education: University of Pennsylvania, University of Chicago
- Scientific career
- Fields: Applied Mathematics, Physics, Fluid Mechanics
- Workplaces: Harvard University
- Doctoral advisor: Leo Kadanoff

Michael P. Brenner is an American applied mathematician and physicist.

== Biography ==
Brenner earned a bachelor's of science degree in physics and mathematics at the University of Pennsylvania and obtained a doctorate in physics under Leo Kadanoff at the University of Chicago. From 1995-2001, he was an assistant and associate professor of applied mathematics at the Massachusetts Institute of Technology. Since 2001, he has been a professor at Harvard University. Within the John A. Paulson School of Engineering and Applied Sciences at Harvard University, Brenner is the Michael F. Cronin Professor of Applied Mathematics and Applied Physics, while at the Department of Physics, he holds the Glover Professorship.

== Research ==
Brenner's research uses methods in applied mathematics to address wide-ranging problems in science and engineering, especially those relating to fluid mechanics and materials science. In the past, his research group have addressed problems related to the breaking of fluid droplets, sonoluminescence, the sedimentation of small particles, device design in engineering, and electrospinning. His current research focuses on the nature of turbulence, self-assembly, atmospheric chemistry, fluid mechanics, and materials science. He has also done research in biology and physiology, studying voltage-gated ion channels and hemoglobin. He is particularly interested in using the most recent advancements in machine learning to facilitate scientific discovery.

== Teaching ==
Michael Brenner created the popular Harvard course, Science of the Physical Universe 27, “Science and Cooking: From Haute Cuisine to the Science of Soft Matter.” The course explores the physical and chemical properties of matter through the lens of cooking science, and incorporates cooking and eating into lab sections. Weekly lectures feature prominent chefs and food experts in the field of “molecular gastronomy”, a discipline that uses science to re-engineer food.
