= Nordic Institute for Theoretical Physics =

Physics research institute

Coordinates: 59°21′10.8″N 18°03′28.8″E

- Abbreviation: Nordita
- Formation: 1957
- Type: Research institute
- Location: Stockholm, Sweden
- Website: www.nordita.org

The Nordic Institute for Theoretical Physics, or NORDITA, or Nordita (Danish: Nordisk Institut for Teoretisk Fysik), is an international organisation for research in theoretical physics. It was established as Nordisk Institut for Teoretisk Atomfysik in 1957 by Niels Bohr and the Swedish physicist Torsten Gustafson. Nordita was originally located at the Niels Bohr Institute in Copenhagen (Denmark) but moved to the AlbaNova University Centre in Stockholm (Sweden) on 1 January 2007. The main research areas at Nordita are astrophysics, hard and soft condensed matter physics, and high-energy physics.

== Research ==
Since Nordita's establishment in 1957, the original focus on research in atomic and nuclear physics has been broadened. Research carried out by Nordita's academic staff presently includes astrophysics, biological physics, hard condensed matter physics and materials physics, soft condensed matter physics, cosmology, statistical physics and complex systems, high-energy physics, gravitational physics, and cosmology. The in-house research forms the backbone of Nordita activities and complements the more service-oriented functions. As part of its mission, Nordita has the task of facilitating interactions between physicists in the Nordic countries as well as with the international community; therefore the comparably small institute has a large number of visitors, conferences, and scientific programs that last several weeks.

Notable former or present researchers at Nordita include Alexander V. Balatsky, Holger Bech Nielsen, Axel Brandenburg, Gerald E. Brown, Paolo Di Vecchia, James Hamilton, John Hertz, Sabine Hossenfelder, Alan Luther, Ben Roy Mottelson, Niels A. Obers, Christopher J. Pethick, Leon Rosenfeld, Kim Sneppen, John Wettlaufer, and Konstantin Zarembo.

== Organization ==
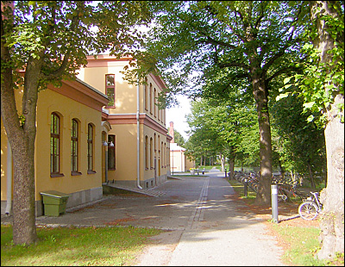
The Nordita East building in Stockholm

Nordita is governed by a board consisting of one representative and one alternate member from each Nordic country, headed by a chair person. The board appoints a number of research committees which evaluate proposals and advice the board on scientific and educational matters.

The Nordita board nominates a director who is appointed by the president of KTH Royal Institute of Technology and the vice-chancellor of Stockholm University. The director, currently Mikael Fogelström, is responsible for the day-to-day administration of the institute and provides scientific leadership.

== Funding ==
Nordita is funded jointly by the Nordic countries via the Nordic Council of Ministers, the Swedish Research Council, and the host universities KTH Royal Institute of Technology, Stockholm University, and Uppsala University.

== See also ==
- Institute for Theoretical Physics (disambiguation)
- Center for Theoretical Physics (disambiguation)
