= Leo Kadanoff =

American physicist (1937–2015)

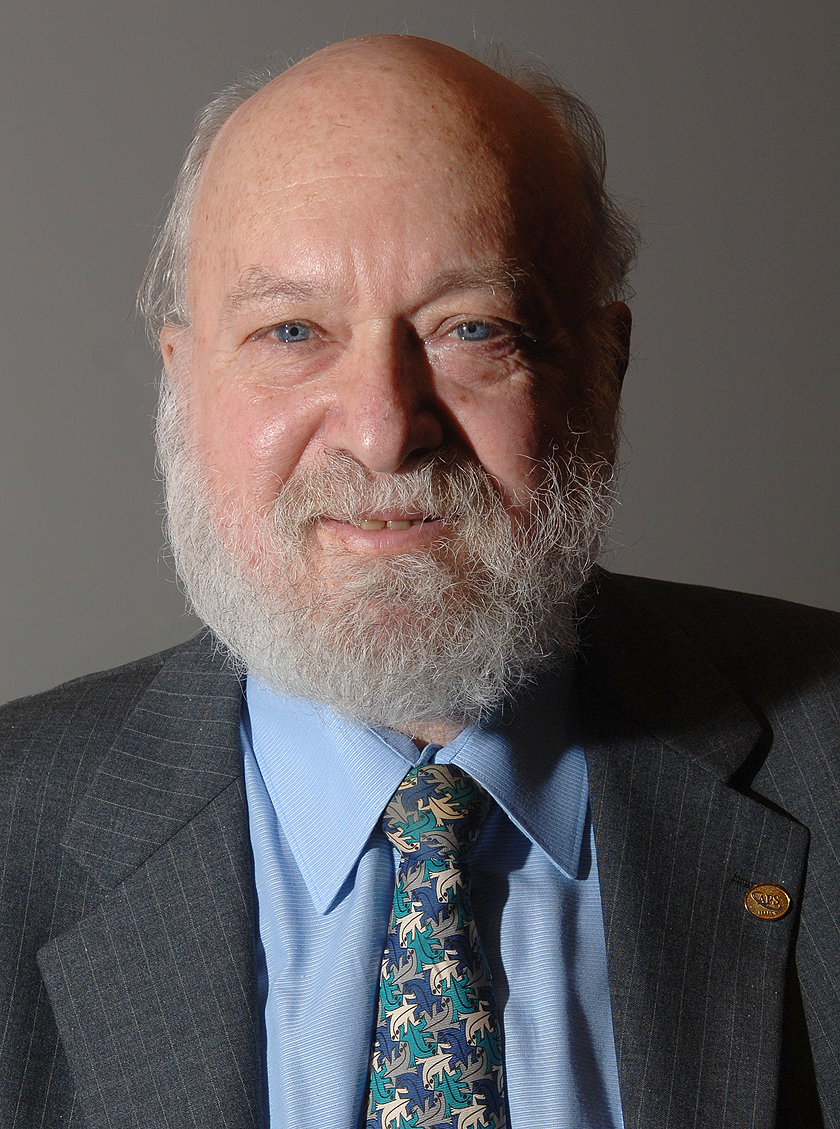
- Born: January 14, 1937; New York City, New York
- Died: October 26, 2015 (aged 78); Chicago, Illinois
- Education: Harvard University (BS, PhD)
- Known for: Renormalization group theory of phase transitions Application of operator algebras in statistical mechanics Universality; Baym–Kadanoff functional
- Awards: Wolf Prize in Physics (1980); Elliott Cresson Medal (1986); Lars Onsager Prize (1998); Lorentz Medal (2006); Isaac Newton Medal (2011)
- Scientific career
- Fields: Theoretical physics
- Workplaces: University of Chicago
- Doctoral advisor: Paul Martin
- Doctoral students: Michael P. Brenner; William A. Dembski; Anette Hosoi; Marcelo Magnasco; Abdullah Sadiq; Scott Shenker; Chao Tang; Jorge V. José

Leo Philip Kadanoff (January 14, 1937 – October 26, 2015) was an American physicist. He was a professor of physics (emeritus from 2004) at the University of Chicago and a former president of the American Physical Society (APS). He contributed to the fields of statistical physics, chaos theory, and theoretical condensed matter physics.

== Biography ==
Kadanoff was raised in New York City. He received his undergraduate degree and doctorate in physics (1960) from Harvard University. After a post-doctorate at the Niels Bohr Institute in Copenhagen, he joined the physics faculty at the University of Illinois in 1965.

Kadanoff's early research focused upon superconductivity. In the late 1960s, he studied the organization of matter in phase transitions. Kadanoff demonstrated that sudden changes in material properties (such as the magnetization of a magnet or the boiling of a fluid) could be understood in terms of scaling and universality. With his collaborators, he showed how all the experimental data then available for the changes, called second-order phase transitions, could be understood in terms of these two ideas. These same ideas have now been extended to apply to a broad range of scientific and engineering problems, and have found numerous and important applications in urban planning, computer science, hydrodynamics, biology, applied mathematics and geophysics. In recognition of these achievements, he won the Buckley Prize of the American Physical Society (1977), the Wolf Prize in Physics (1980), the 1989 Boltzmann Medal of the International Union of Pure and Applied Physics, and the 2006 Lorentz Medal.

In 1969 he moved to Brown University. He exploited mathematical analogies between solid state physics and urban growth to shed insights into the latter field, so much so that he contributed substantially to the statewide planning program in Rhode Island. In 1978 he moved to the University of Chicago, where he became the John D. and Catherine T. MacArthur Distinguished Service Professor of Physics and Mathematics. Much of his work in the second half of his career involved contributions to chaos theory, in both mechanical and fluid systems. He was elected a Fellow of the American Academy of Arts and Sciences in 1982.

He was one of the recipients of the 1999 National Medal of Science, awarded by President Clinton. He was a member of the National Academy of Sciences and of the American Philosophical Society as well as being a Fellow of the American Physical Society and of the American Association for the Advancement of Science. During the last decade, he has received the Quantrell Award (for excellence in teaching) from the University of Chicago, the Centennial Medal of Harvard University, the Lars Onsager Prize of the American Physical Society, and the Grande Medaille d'Or of the Académie des sciences de l'Institut de France.

His textbook with Gordon Baym, Quantum Statistical Mechanics (ISBN 020141046X), is a prominent text in the field and has been widely translated.

With Leo Irakliotis, Kadanoff established the Center for Presentation of Science at the University of Chicago.

In June 2013, it was stated that anonymous donors had provided a $3.5 million gift to establish the Leo Kadanoff Center for Theoretical Physics at the University of Chicago. He died after complications from an illness on October 26, 2015. In 2018 the American Physical Society established the Leo P. Kadanoff Prize in his honor.

== Publications (selection) ==
- "Scaling laws for Ising models near $T_c$", Physics 2(263), 1966. (The seminal paper for the development of renormalization group theory; see History of renormalization group theory.)
- "Operator Algebra and the Determination of Critical Indices", Phys. Rev. Lett. 23(1430), 1969. (The seminal paper for the development of conformal field theory; see History of conformal field theory.)
