= Jean-Michel Raimond =

French physicist (born 1955)

- Born: 11 December 1955 (age 70); Orléans
- Awards: Chevalier de la Légion d'honneur Officer of the Ordre des Palmes Académiques
- Scientific career
- Fields: Quantum mechanics

Jean-Michel Raimond (born 11 December 1955 in Orléans) is a French physicist working in the field of quantum mechanics.

== Biography ==
Raimond enrolled at the École normale supérieure (rue d'Ulm) (ENS) in 1975. After graduating with a DEA in atomic and molecular physics, his first research work was in superradiance and Rydberg atoms.

He became Research Associate and Research Fellow at the Centre national de la recherche scientifique (CNRS), working under Serge Haroche towards his 1984 thesis Propriétés radiatives des atomes de Rydberg dans une cavité résonnante ("Radiative properties of Rydberg atoms in a resonant cavity").

Since 1988, he has taught at the Université Pierre-et-Marie-Curie.

From 1994 to 1999, he was a junior member of the Institut universitaire de France.

From 2001 to 2011, he was a senior member and held the chair of quantum optics.

From 2004 to 2009, he was head of the Department of Physics at the École normale supérieure (rue d'Ulm).

Raimond specialised in atomic physics and quantum optics as a member of the Kastler-Brossel Laboratory in the Groupe d'Électrodynamique Quantique en Cavité, which he ran with the 2012 Nobel Prize winner Serge Haroche and Michel Brune.

He became interested in Rydberg atoms, because their relatively large size and sensitivity to microwave radiation makes them particularly suited to studies of matter/energy interaction. He demonstrated that these atoms, coupled to superconducting cavities containing some photons, are ideal systems for testing the laws of quantum decoherence and for demonstrating the possibility of constructing the components of quantum logic, with promising results for their use in informatics.

His most recent work, quoted in the 2012 Nobel Prize-winning work, allows photons to be counted in the cavity without their being destroyed, thus directly demonstrating the quantum measurement problem. This ideal measure also helps combat quantum decoherence with a quantum feedback scheme which keeps the number of photons in the cavity constant.

Raimond is the son of Michel Raimond, late professor of French literature at the Sorbonne.

== Awards ==
- Prix Fernand Holweck by the Académie des sciences (1985)
- Grand prix Ampère de l'Électricité de France, given by the Académie des sciences, with M. Brune (1998)
- Grand Prix Jean-Ricard by the Société française de physique (2007)
- Gay-Lussac-Humboldt research award by the Fondation Alexander von Humboldt (2012)
- European Physical Society Edison-Volta prize (2014)
- Chevalier de la Légion d'honneur
- Officer of the Ordre des Palmes Académiques

== Principal publications ==
- Brune, M.; Hagley, E.; Dreyer, J.; Maître, X.; Maali, A.; Wunderlich, C.; Raimond, J. M.; Haroche, S. (1996). "Observing the Progressive Decoherence of the "Meter" in a Quantum Measurement". Phys. Rev. Lett. 77 (24): 4887–4890. Bibcode:1996PhRvL..77.4887B. doi:10.1103/physrevlett.77.4887. PMID 10062660. In this experiment, for the first time, wave function collapse was observed using quantum mechanical methods.
- Raimond, J. M.; Brune, M; Haroche, S. (2001). "Manipulating quantum entanglement with atoms and photons in a cavity". Rev. Mod. Phys. 73 (3): 565–582. Bibcode:2001RvMP...73..565R. doi:10.1103/revmodphys.73.565.). Peer reviewed article describing in particular quantum logical operations.
- Haroche, S.; Raimond, J. M. (10 August 2006). Exploring the Quantum: Atoms, Cavities, and photons. Oxford: Oxford University Press.
- Gleyzes, S.; et al. (2007). "Quantum jumps of light recording the birth and death of a photon in a cavity". Nature. 446 (7133). London: 297–300. arXiv:quant-ph/0612031. Bibcode:2007Natur.446..297G. doi:10.1038/nature05589. PMID 17361178. S2CID 4428931. First ideal measurement (i.e. without quantum demolition) of the number of photons in a cavity.
- Guerlin, C.; et al. (2007). "Progressive field state collapse and quantum non demolition photon counting". Nature. 448 (7156). London: 889–893. arXiv:0707.3880. Bibcode:2007Natur.448..889G. doi:10.1038/nature06057. PMID 17713527. S2CID 4429859.
- Sayri, C.; et al. (2011). "Real time quantum feedback prepares and stabilizes photon number states". Nature. 477 (7362). London: 73–77. arXiv:1107.4027. Bibcode:2011Natur.477...73S. doi:10.1038/nature10376. PMID 21886159. S2CID 4383517. First demonstration of a quantum retroaction schema in a quantum continuum.
