= Jacobus (name) =

Jacobus is a masculine first name, which is a variant of Jacob, Jack and James. The name may refer to:

== First name ==
- Jacobus Arminius (1560–1609), Dutch theologian
- Jacobus de Baen (1673–1700), Dutch portrait painter
- Jacobus Barbireau (1455–1491), Flemish composer
- Jacobus Barnaart (1726–1780), Dutch merchant
- Jacobus Bartschius (c.1600–1633), German astronomer
- Jacobus Bellamy (1757–1786), Dutch poet
- Jacobus Franciscus Benders (1924–2017), Dutch mathematician
- Jacobus Bisschop (1658–1697), Dutch painter
- Jacobus Cornelis Bloem (1825–1902), Dutch Minister of Finance
- Jacobus Bontius (1592–1631), Dutch physician
- Jacobus Boomsma (born 1951), Dutch evolutionary biologist
- Jacobus Boonen (1573–1655), Flemish Archbishop
- Jacobus Nicolaas Boshoff (1808–1881), South African politician
- Jacobus Buys (1724–1801), Dutch painter
- Jacobus Capitein (c.1717–1747), Dutch Christian minister of Ghanaian birth
- Jacobus a Castro (1560–1639), Dutch bishop
- Jacobus de Cessolis (c.1250–c.1322), Italian chess author
- Jacobus Petrus Duminy (1897–1980), South African academic
- Jacobus Josephus Eeckhout (1793–1861), Flemish painter
- Jacobus van Egmond (1908–1969), Dutch cyclist
- Jacobus Johannes Fouché (1898–1980), South African politician and president
- Jacobus Cornelis Gaal (1796–1866), Dutch painter
- Jacobus Golius (1596–1667), Dutch mathematician
- Jacobus Arnoldus Graaff (1863–1927), South African politician
- Jacobus Henricus van 't Hoff (1852–1911), Dutch physical chemist and Nobel Laureate
- Jacobus Kaper (born 1931), biochemist and virologist
- Jacobus Kapteyn (1851–1922), Dutch astronomer
- Jacobus de Kerle (1531–1591), Flemish composer and organist
- Jacobus Kloppers (born 1937), Canadian composer
- Jacobus Hendricus van Lint (1932–2004), Dutch mathematician and university president
- Jacobus van Looy (1855–1930), Dutch painter and writer
- Jacobus Mancadan (1602–1680), Dutch painter
- Jacobus Anthonie Meessen (1836–1885), Dutch photographer
- Jacobus van Meteren (1519–c.1555), Dutch printer; printed first English-language Bible in Antwerp
- Jacobus Oud (1890–1963), Dutch architect
- Jacobus Hendrik Pierneef (1886–1957), South African landscape artist
- Jacobus Ferdinandus Saey (1658–1726), Flemish painter
- Jacobus Wilhelmus Sauer (1850–1913), South African politician
- Jacobus Spoors (1751–1833), Dutch politician
- Jacobus Gideon Nel Strauss (1900–1990), South African politician
- Jacobus Swartwout (1734–1827), American general and politician
- Jacobus de la Torre (1608–1661), Dutch Archbishop
- Jacobus Van Cortlandt (1658–1739), American mayor
- Jacobus van der Merwe (born 1937), South African politician
- Jacobus van der Vecht (1906–1992), Dutch entomologist
- Jacobus de Voragine (c.1230–1298), Italian chronicler and archbishop of Genoa
- Jacobus Johannes Venter (1814–1889), South African politician
- Jacobus Verhoeff (1927–2018), Dutch mathematician
- Jacobus Verster (1919–1981), South African general
- Jacobus van de Water (1643–1712), Dutch mayor of New Amsterdam
- Jacobus, pseudonym of Jacques Alphonse Doucet of Radio Radio

== Surname ==
- Donald Lines Jacobus (1887–1970), American genealogist
- Melancthon Williams Jacobus Sr.
- Melancthon Williams Jacobus Jr.
- Marc Jacobus (born 1951), American bridge player
- Preston Jacobus (1864–1911), American businessman and politician
- Russell Jacobus (1944–2023), American bishop
- Tim Jacobus (born 1959), American artist

== See also ==
- Jacob (name)
