= Kaper =

Kaper is a Dutch surname. Notable people with the surname include:

- Bronisław Kaper (1902–1983), Polish film composer
- Hans G. Kaper (born 1936), Dutch-American mathematician
- Jacobus Kaper (born 1931), biochemist and virologist
- Tasso J. Kaper (born 1964), American mathematician

== See also ==
- Kapper
