= Kappers =

Kappers is a surname and may refer to:

- C. U. Ariëns Kappers (1877-1946), Dutch neurologist
  - Ariëns Kappers Medal, a scientific honor named after the Dutch neurologist Cornelius Ubbo Ariëns Kappers
- Marnix Kappers (1943–2016), Dutch cabaret artist and actor

== See also ==
- Kapper
