= Landau Gold Medal =

Physics award of the Russian Academy of sciences

The Landau Gold Medal (Russian: Премия имени Л. Д. Ландау) is the highest award in theoretical physics awarded by the Russian Academy of Sciences and its predecessor the Soviet Academy of Sciences. It was established in 1971 and is named after Soviet physicist and Nobel Laureate Lev Landau. When awarded by the Soviet Academy of Sciences the award was the "Landau Prize"; the name was changed to the "Landau Gold Medal" in 1992.

== Prize laureates ==
- 1971 - Vladimir Gribov
- 1974 - Evgeny Lifshitz, Vladimir Belinski, and Isaak Khalatnikov
- 1977 - Arkady Migdal
- 1980 - Aleksandr Gurevich and Lev Pitaevskii
- 1981- Eva Jablonka
- 1983 - Alexander Patashinski and Valery Pokrovsky
- 1986 - Boris Shklovskii and Alexei L. Efros
- 1989 - Alexei Abrikosov, Lev Gor'kov, and Igor Dzyaloshinskii
- 1992 - Grigoriy Volovik and Vladimir P. Mineev
- 1998 - Spartak Belyaev
- 2002 - Lev Okun
- 2008 - Lev Pitaevskii
- 2013 - Semyon Gershtein
- 2018 - Valery Pokrovsky

== See also ==
- List of physics awards
- Prizes named after people
