= Phillip Holmes =

Phillip Holmes may refer to:

- Phillips Holmes (1907–1942), American actor
- Philip Holmes (born 1945), American engineering professor
