= Nonlinearity (journal) =

- Discipline: Nonlinear systems
- Language: English
- Edited by: Tasso J Kaper and Konstantin Khanin

Publication details
- History: 1988-present
- Publisher: IOP Publishing and the London Mathematical Society (United Kingdom)
- Frequency: Monthly
- Open access: Hybrid
- Impact factor: 1.8 (2025)

Standard abbreviations
- ISO 4: Nonlinearity

Indexing
- CODEN: NONLE5
- ISSN: 0951-7715 (print); 1361-6544 (web)
- LCCN: 88658614
- OCLC no.: 629195260

Links
- Journal homepage

Nonlinearity is a peer-reviewed scientific journal published by IOP Publishing and the London Mathematical Society. The journal publishes papers on nonlinear mathematics, mathematical physics, experimental physics, theoretical physics and other areas in the sciences where nonlinear phenomena are of fundamental importance. The editors-in-chief are Tasso Kaper (Boston University) for IOP Publishing and Konstantin Khanin (University of Toronto) for the London Mathematical Society.

== Abstracting and indexing ==
The journal is abstracted and indexed in Science Citation Index, Current Contents/Physical, Chemical & Earth Sciences, Inspec, CompuMath Citation Index, Mathematical Reviews, MathSciNet, Zentralblatt MATH, and VINITI Database RAS. According to the Journal Citation Reports, the journal has a 2025 impact factor of 1.8.

== See also ==
- Journal of Physics A
- Inverse Problems
- London Mathematical Society
- IOP Publishing
