= Jinqiao Duan =

Mathematician

- Born: 1962 (age 63–64); Wuhan, Hubei, China
- Education: Cornell University; UMass Amherst; Chinese Academy of Sciences; Wuhan University
- Known for: Stochastic dynamical systems, Stochastic partial differential equations
- Scientific career
- Fields: Mathematics and related interdisciplinary areas
- Workplaces: Caltech; Clemson University; Illinois Institute of Technology
- Doctoral advisor: Philip J. Holmes

Jinqiao Duan (Chinese: 段金桥; born in December 1962 in the lunar calendar and in January 1963 in the Gregorian calendar) is a professor of mathematics at the Illinois Institute of Technology.

He is known for scientific contributions to stochastic and nonlinear dynamics, stochastic partial differential equations, non-equilibrium statistical physics, and applications to biophysical and geophysical sciences. His current research also includes data science and stochastic dynamics, stochastic Hamilton/Contact dynamics and geometric mechanics, and open quantum dynamics and stochastic dynamics. His particular contributions include a random invariant manifold framework, effective reduction and approximation, quantifying non-Gaussian stochastic dynamics by nonlocal partial differential equations, a nonlocal Kramers-Moyal formula, non-Gaussian data assimilation, Onsager-Machlup action functional theory, and transitions between metastable states for stochastic dynamical systems (especially with non-Gaussian Levy fluctuations).

He served as Associate Director of the Institute for Pure and Applied Mathematics in Los Angeles from 2011-2013. He is the director of the Center for Stochastic Dynamics at the Illinois Institute of Technology.

He earned a BS degree in Computational Mathematics from Wuhan University; MS degree in Mathematical Physics from the Chinese Academy of Sciences; MS degree in Mathematics from the University of Massachusetts Amherst, and a PhD degree in Applied Mathematics from Cornell University. He was a postdoc with Stephen Wiggins and an instructor at the California Institute of Technology (Caltech).

== Scientific contributions ==
Duan's research focuses on several areas of stochastic dynamics, including:

1. A framework for random invariant manifolds
2. Dynamical features of stochastic systems under non-Gaussian Levy fluctuations
3. Effective dynamics of stochastic partial differential equations
4. Transition pathways and transition time & an Onsager-Machlup action functional theory for stochastic systems under non-Gaussian Levy fluctuations
5. Data assimilation for non-Gaussian stochastic dynamical systems
6. Stochastic Dynamics & Data Science

Duan's research fields include the theory, calculation and simulation of stochastic dynamical systems and nonlinear dynamical systems, as well as the trans-disciplinary researches of mathematics and other fields (random and complex phenomena related to the earth and environmental science, life sciences, etc).

Jinqiao Duan has made important contributions to the research of non-Gaussian stochastic dynamical systems, homogenization of stochastic partial differential equations and related application research fields, and was supported by a number of scientific research funds and programs.

He is the managing editor for Stochastics and Dynamics and Editor-in-Chief for Interdisciplinary Mathematical Sciences. Additionally, Duang serves as an editor for Nonlinear Processes in Geophysics.

== Selected publications ==
- Jinqiao Duan, Kening Lu, Björn Schmalfuss. "Invariant manifolds for stochastic partial differential equations," The Annals of Probability, Ann. Probab. 31(4), 2109-2135, (October 2003)
- D. Schertzer and M. Larchevêque, J. Duan, V. V. Yanovsky, S. Lovejoy. "Fractional Fokker–Planck equation for nonlinear stochastic differential equations driven by non-Gaussian Lévy stable noises", J. Math. Phys. 42, 200-212 (2001) https://doi.org/10.1063/1.1318734
- Yang Li, Jinqiao Duan. "A data-driven approach for discovering stochastic dynamical systems with non-Gaussian Lévy noise", Physica D: Nonlinear Phenomena, Volume 417, 2021, 132830, ISSN 0167-2789, https://doi.org/10.1016/j.physd.2020.132830
- Yubin Lu, Yang Li and Jinqiao Duan. "Extracting stochastic governing laws by non-local Kramers–Moyal formulae", Phil. Trans. R. Soc. A.380: 20210195. 20210195 http://doi.org/10.1098/rsta.2021.0195
- Wei Wei, Ting Gao, Xiaoli Chen, and Jinqiao Duan, An optimal control method to compute the most likely transition path for stochastic dynamical systems with jumps. Chaos 32, 051102 (2022); https://doi.org/10.1063/5.009392
- Jianyu Hu, Dongfang Li, Jinqiao Duan and Xiaoli Chen, Data-driven method to learn the most probable transition pathway and stochastic differential equations, Physica D, 2023. https://doi.org/10.1016/j.physd.2022.133559
- Jintao Wang, Desheng Li, Jinqiao Duan, Compactly generated shape index theory and its application to a retarded nonautonomous parabolic equation. Topological Methods in Nonlinear Analysis. Volume 59, No. 1, 2022, 1-33. doi:10.12775/TMNA.2021.031
- Y. Li and J. Duan, Extracting Governing Laws from Sample Path Data of Non-Gaussian Stochastic Dynamical Systems. Journal of Statistical Physics (2022) 186:30.
- P. Wei, Y. Chao and J. Duan, Hamiltonian Systems with Lévy Noise: Symplecticity, Hamilton’s Principle and Averaging Principle. Physica D 398 (2019) 69-83.
- Pingyuan Wei and Zibo Wang, Formulation of stochastic contact Hamiltonian systems. Chaos 31, 041101 (2021); https://doi.org/10.1063/5.0047920
- Dandan Li, Jinqiao Duan, Li Lin, and Ao Zhang, Bohmian trajectories of the time-oscillating Schringer equations Chaos 31, 101101 (2021); https://doi.org/10.1063/5.0067645
- Huang, Yuanfei; Chao, Ying; Wei, Wei; and Duan, Jinqiao, Estimating the Most Probable Transition Time for Stochastic Dynamical Systems. Nonlinearity, 2021, vol. 34, 4543.
- Qi Zhang and J. Duan, Linear Response Theory for Nonlinear Stochastic Differential Equations with α–stable Lévy Noises. Journal of Statistical Physics 182, 32 (2021).
- Xiaoli Chen, Jinqiao Duan and George Em Karniadakis, Learning and Meta-Learning of Stochastic Advection-Diffusion-Reaction Systems from Sparse Measurements. European J. Appl. Math., 15 June 2020. doi:10.1017/S0956792520000169
- A. Zhang and J. Duan, Effective Wave Factorization for a Stochastic Schrödinger Equation. Physica D, Volume 411, October 2020, 132573. https://doi.org/10.1016/j.physd.2020.132573
- Yayun Zheng, Fang Yang, Jinqiao Duan, Xu Sun, Ling Fu and Jürgen Kurths, The maximum likelihood climate change for global warming under the influence of greenhouse effect and Lévy noise. Chaos, 30, 013132 (2020); https://doi.org/10.1063/1.5129003.
- Fang Yang, Yayun Zheng, Jinqiao Duan, Ling Fu and Stephen Wiggins, The tipping times in an Arctic sea ice system under influence of extreme events. Chaos 30, 063125 (2020).
- Ying Chao and Jinqiao Duan, The Onsager-Machlup function as Lagrangian for the most probable path of a jump-diffusion process. Nonlinearity, 32 (2019) 3715 - 3741.
- S. Yuan and J. Duan, Action Functionals for Stochastic Differential Equations with Lévy Noise. Communications on Stochastic Analysis, Vol 13, No. 3, 2019, Article 10. doi:10.31390/cosa.13.3.10
- H. Qiao, Y. Zhang and J. Duan. Effective filtering on a random slow manifold. Nonlinearity 31 (2018) 4649-4666
- L. Serdukova, Y. Zheng, J. Duan and J. Kurths. Metastable phenomena in a dynamical system with discontinuous vector field. Scientific Reports (2017) 7: 9336.
- Wei Zou, D. V. Senthilkumar, Raphael Nagao, Istvan Z. Kiss, Yang Tang, Aneta Koseska, Jinqiao Duan and Jurgen Kurths, Restoration of rhythmicity in diffusively coupled dynamical networks. Nature-Communications. July 15, 2015. doi:10.1038/ncomms8709

Author links open overlay panel

== Books ==
- An Introduction to Stochastic Dynamics, Cambridge University Press, 2015.
- Effective Dynamics of Stochastic Partial Differential Equations (with Wei Wang), Elsevier, 2014.
- Probability and Partial Differential Equations in Modern Applied Mathematics (with E. Waymire, Eds.), Springer-Verlag, 2005.
- Recent Development in Stochastic Dynamics and Stochastic Analysis (with S. Luo and C. Wang, Eds.), World Scientific, New Jersey, 2010.
