= Alexander Patashinski =

Russian physicist (1936-2020)

- Александр Паташинский
- Born: 1936
- Died: February 22, 2020 (aged 83–84); Seattle, Washington, United States
- Education: Moscow Institute of Physics and Technology
- Known for: Theoretical physics
- Awards: Landau Prize of the USSR Academy of Sciences
- Scientific career
- Fields: Physics
- Workplaces: Budker Institute of Nuclear Physics; Novosibirsk State University; Northwestern University
- Doctoral advisor: Lev Davidovich Landau

Alexander Zakharovich Patashinski (Russian: Александр Захарович Паташинский, born in 1936) was a Soviet and Russian physicist. He was a professor at Northwestern University in Evanston, Illinois.

He died February 22, 2020, of heart failure near his home in Seattle.

== Early life ==
He received his master's degree in Physical Engineering from the Moscow Institute of Physics and Technology (MFTI) in 1960 on the subject of low temperature physics. He then pursued graduate studies in high energy physics at the Kapitza Institute in Moscow and at the Institute of Thermophysics in Novosibirsk Academgorodok. In 1963, he defended his PhD thesis on Quantum Field Theory at the Novosibirsk Scientific Center (scientific advisor Lev Landau).

== Career ==
He was a scientist at the Siberian Branch of the Academy of Sciences of the USSR, at the Institute of Thermal Physics (1960-1968) and the Budker Institute of Nuclear Physics (1968-1997). He was also employed as a professor of Physics and Mathematics at Novosibirsk State University (1974-1992).

In 1992, he became a professor at Northwestern University, Evanston, Illinois. His work on nonequilibrium critical phenomena was supported by research grants from NASA and his studies of polymeric materials were supported by Dow Chemical Company.

His areas of research are quantum mechanics, statistical physics, condensed matter theory, high energy physics, general relativity, turbulence theory, theory of liquids and glasses. He is best known for his pioneering and fundamental contributions to the modern theory of phase transitions in collaboration with Valery Pokrovsky, as well as the collective tube model in the theory of hadron-nuclei collisions at high energies, applications of the pattern recognition theory to local structure in liquids, and liquid-liquid phase transitions.

== Honours and awards ==
Awards to Patashinski include the Order of Labor Glory (USSR, 1990), Scientific Achievement Diploma (USSR, 1986) and the Landau Prize of the Soviet Academy of Sciences in 1983. The announcement for the 1982 Nobel Prize in Physics, which was awarded to Kenneth G. Wilson, acknowledges Patashinski, Michael E. Fisher, Valery Pokrovsky, and Leo Kadanoff for important contributions to the theory of critical phenomena.

He was elected a Fellow of the American Physical Society in 2003.

== Research ==
In 1962 and 1963, Patashinski, Valery Pokrovsky and Isaak Khalatnikov solved the problem of quasi-classical scattering in three dimensions. In 1963–1965, together with Valery Pokrovsky, Patashinski developed the fluctuating theory of phase transitions. This theory was then applied to a wide range of phase transition problems, including critical slowdown of chemical reactions, brownian motion, electric conductivity near the magnetic ordering point, nucleation in near-critical systems. Other contributions of Patashinski include the theory of gravitational collapse in non-spherically-symmetric systems, the collective tube model for hadron-nucleus collisions at high-energies, nonequilibrium critical phenomena. From 1970, Patashinski and his students B. Shumilo, A. Mitus, L.Son studied the local structure of liquids and glasses, and predicted liquid-liquid phase transitions with changes of this structure; this prediction was later confirmed by experiments.

In 1992, together with Kalle Levon and Alla Margolina, Patashinski proposed the concept of double percolation for conductive polymers.

== Selected publications ==
- A. Z. Patashinskii, V. L. Pokrovskii, and I. M. Khalatnikov, "Regge poles in quasiclassical potential well problems," Sov. Phys. JETP 17, 1387-1397 (1963).
- A. Z. Patashinskii, V. L. Pokrovskii, "Fluctuation Theory of Phase Transitions," Pergamon Press 1979; ISBN 0080216641.
- K. Levon, A. Margolina, A. Z. Patashinski, "Multiple percolation in conductive polymer blends", Macromolecules 26, 4061 (1993).
- A. Z. Patashinski, A. C. Mitus, M. A. Ratner "Towards understanding the local structure of liquids", Physics Reports 288, 409-434 (1997).
- H. T. Baytekin, A. Z. Patashinski, M. Branicki, B. Baytekin, S. Soh, B. A. Grzybowski, "The Mosaic of Surface Charge in Contact Electrification", Science 333, 308 (2011).
