= Grigory E. Volovik =

Russian theoretical physicist

Grigory (or Grigori or Grigorii) Efimovich Volovik (Григорий Ефимович Воловик; born 7 September 1946 in Moscow) is a Russian theoretical physicist, who specializes in condensed matter physics. He is known for the Volovik effect.

== Education and career ==
After graduating in 1970 from the Moscow Institute of Physics and Technology, Volovik became a graduate student at Moscow's Landau Institute for Theoretical Physics, where his received his Russian Candidate of Science degree (Ph.D.) in 1973. His thesis was on Dynamics of a particle strongly interacting with a Bose System. He has held since 1973 an appointment as a staff member of the Landau Institute and since 1993 a simultaneous appointment as a professor at the Low Temperature Laboratory (now called the Olli Lounasmaa Laboratory) at the Helsinki University of Technology (now called Aalto University). In 1981 he received from the Landau Institute his Russian Doctor of Sciences degree (habilitation). His Russian doctoral thesis was on Topology of defects in condensed matter. He is the author or co-author of over 450 research publications.

Volovik won in 1992 the Landau Gold Medal. He received in 2004 the Simon Memorial Prize "for his pioneering research on the effects of symmetry in superfluids and superconductors and for extending theses concepts to quantum field theory, cosmology, quantum gravity and particle physics." In 2014 he shared the Lars Onsager Prize with Vladimir Petrovich Mineev for "their contribution to a comprehensive classification of topological defects in condensed matter phases with broken symmetry, culminating in the prediction of half-quantum vortices in superfluid He-3 and related systems." Volovik was elected in 2001 a foreign member of the Finnish Academy of Science and Letters and in 2007 of the German Academy of Sciences Leopoldina.

Volovik's research deals with low temperature quantum spin liquids (such as liquid helium), superfluids, unconventional superconductivity (e.g. in systems of heavy fermions), the physics of glasses and liquid crystals, quantum turbulence, intrinsic quantum Hall effect, coherent states in the Larmor precession. He proposed ideas and novel experiments to investigate analogies between phenomena of quantum field theory and astrophysics and phenomena of solid state physics. He proposed a solution to the problem of the cosmological constant from analogies to solid state physics, in which, unlike particle physics and quantum gravity, the microscopic model is precisely known. In 2010 with Frans R. Klinkhamer, he published Towards a solution of the cosmological constant problem.

Volovik collaborated with the experimentalist Yuri Mikhailovich Bunkov on the study of particle physics analogues and phenomena in helium-3. In quantum field theory, liquid helium-3 is a good model of the vacuum state in elementary particle physics, with fermions as elementary excitations and bosons such as photons, gravitons, gluons as collective ones. According to Volovik's research, excitations and fundamental physical symmetry laws such as gauge and Lorentz invariance are "emergent" laws at sufficiently low temperatures. His view of the emergence of gravitation as a collective vacuum excitation stands in Russia in the tradition of a theory by Andrei Sakharov. In the case of helium-3, this is expressed by the loss of symmetry at high energies (gas) and the formation (emergence) of symmetries such as translational invariance in the superfluid state at low temperatures. There are phenomena in between a phase with global U(1) and two SO(3) symmetries and, at even lower temperatures, in the A-phase additional symmetries which, according to Volovik, are analogous to those observed symmetries (i.e., Lorentz and gauge symmetries and general covariance) of the Standard Model. Volovik calls the latter phenomenon "anti-GUT".

He investigated many-body problems from the point of view of classifying their properties as topological defects. In 2007 he published a Fermi point scenario making the assumption that gravity is "an emergent low-energy phenomenon arising from a topologically stable defect in momentum space". He did research on the topological invariants of the Standard Model and the possible topological quantum phase transitions that occur between the Standard Model's vacuum states.

In the first decade of the 21st century he served on the steering committee of the European Science Foundation's program Cosmology in the Laboratory (COSLAB).

== Books ==
- The Universe in a Helium Droplet. Clarendon Press, Oxford 2003; hbk ISBN 978-0-19-850782-6; 2009 edition. (over 3000 citations)
- Exotic properties of superfluid ^{3}He. World Scientific 1992.
- with Mário Novello and Matt Visser (eds.): Artificial Black Holes. World Scientific, 2002 (with a chapter by Volovik: Effective Gravity and quantum vacuum in superfluids), pp. 127–178
- with R. Huebener and N. Schopohl (eds.): Vortices in unconventional superconductors and superfluids. Springer Verlag, 2002; 2013 edition (with an introduction by Volovik: The beautiful world of the vortex, pp. 1–4)
