= Ariëns Kappers Medal =

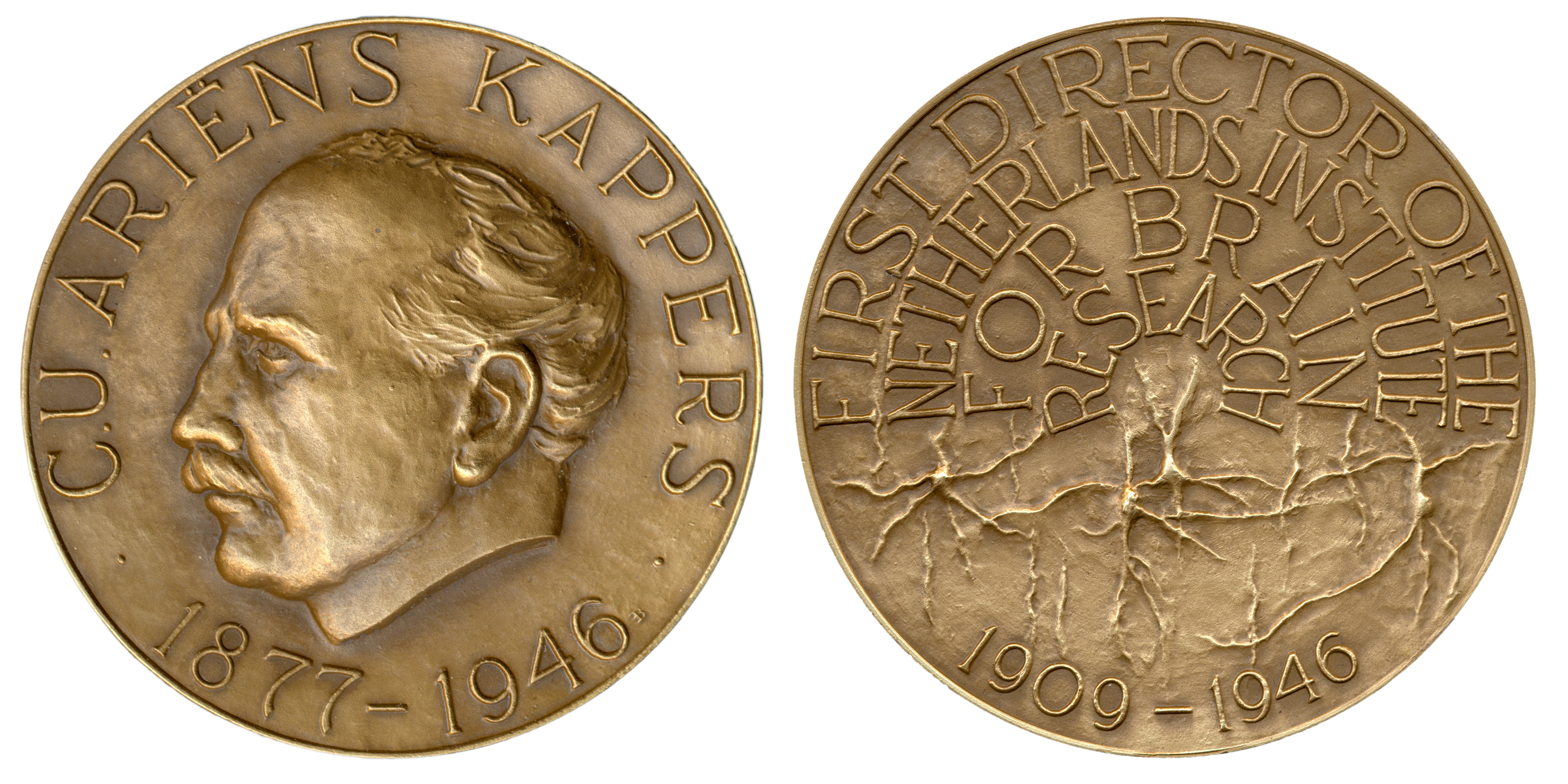
Ariëns Kappers Medal

The Ariëns Kappers Medal is a scientific honor named after the Dutch neurologist Cornelius Ubbo Ariëns Kappers, the first director of the Netherlands Central Institute for Brain Research (Nederlands Instituut voor Hersenonderzoek), now the Netherlands Institute for Neuroscience, from 1909 to 1946. The medal is awarded by the Royal Netherlands Academy of Arts and Sciences on recommendation of the Netherlands Institute for Neuroscience to people who have made an outstanding contribution to neuroscience.

== Recipients of the Ariëns Kappers Medal ==
- Pasko Rakic (1987)
- Anders Björklund (1988)
- Mortimer Mishkin (1989)
- Robert Y. Moore (1991)
- Dale Purves (1993)
- Joseph S. Takahashi (1995)
- Patricia S. Goldman-Rakic (1996)
- Dean H. Hamer (1999)
- Gerald M. Edelman (1999)
- Vilayanur Ramachandran (1999)
- Steven Rose (1999)
- Michael Gazzaniga (1999)
- Antonio Damasio (1999)
- Rudolf Nieuwenhuys (2000)
- Mark H. Tuszynski (2001)
- Dennis D.M. O'Leary (2003)
- Clifford B. Saper (2005)
- James W. Fawcett (2008)
- Frans B.M. De Waal (2009)
- Marcus Raichle (2010)
- Györgi Buzsáki (2014)
- Rui M. Costa (2017)
- Roberto Malinow (2019)
- Karl Deisseroth (2021)
