= Sue Ann Campbell =

Canadian applied mathematician and computational neuroscientist

Sue Ann Campbell is a Canadian applied mathematician and computational neuroscientist known for her work on dynamical systems, delay differential equations, and their applications in modeling neural networks, population dynamics, and balance. She is a professor of applied mathematics at the University of Waterloo, former chair of the Department of Applied Mathematics, associate dean for research and international in the university's Faculty of Mathematics, and president of the Canadian Applied and Industrial Mathematical Society.

== Education and career ==
Campbell has a bachelor's degree in mathematics (B.Math.) from the University of Waterloo, earned in 1986. She completed her Ph.D. in 1991 at Cornell University. Her dissertation, The Effects of Symmetry on the Dynamics of Low-Dimensional Modal Interactions, was supervised by Philip Holmes.

She was a postdoctoral researcher at the University of Montreal before taking an assistant professor position at Concordia University. She returned to the University of Waterloo as an assistant professor in 1994.

She was elected as president of the Canadian Applied and Industrial Mathematical Society in 2021, for a term beginning in 2023.

== Recognition ==
Campbell was the 2005 winner of the Arthur Beaumont Distinguished Service Award of the Canadian Applied and Industrial Mathematics Society.
