= Valery Pokrovsky =

Russian physicist

- Валерий Покровский
- Born: January 1, 1931
- Education: Kharkov University, Tomsk University
- Awards: Landau Prize
- Scientific career
- Fields: Physicist
- Workplaces: Landau Institute, Texas A&M University
- Doctoral advisor: Yuri Rumer
- Doctoral students: Alexei Kitaev
- Website: physics.tamu.edu/directory/v_pokrovsky/

Valery Leonidovich Pokrovsky (Russian: Валерий Леонидович Покровский; born 1 January 1931) is a Soviet and Russian physicist. He is a member of the Landau Institute in Chernogolovka near Moscow in Russia and a Distinguished Professor of Theoretical Physics and holder of the William R. Thurman ’58 Chair in Physics at Texas A&M University. He has twice received the Landau Prize of the Soviet Academy of Science, in 1984 and in 2018.

== Early life and education ==
Valery Leonidovich Pokrovsky was born on 1 January 1931 to Leonid Pokrovsky and Raisa Razumovsky in the former Soviet Union, growing up during the Stalinist era and World War II. In 1948, he became a student of the Department of Physics and Mathematics of Kharkov University. Despite a politically-motivated attempt to expel him, Pokrovsky completed his master's degree, graduating from Kharkov University, Ukrainian SSR, USSR in May 1953.

Pokrovsky and his wife, Svetlana Krylova, were then sent to Novosibirsk, where Pokrovsky became a student of an exiled scientist, Yuri Borisovich Rumer. For his Ph.D. work, Pokrovsky developed a type of polynomial and extended Charles L. Dolph's theory of optimal linear arrays. Valery Pokrovsky defended his PhD thesis at Tomsk University in 1957.

== Career ==
In 1955, Yuri Rumer's rights of citizenship were restored and he began to build up his research group. In 1957, the Siberian Branch of the Academy of Sciences of the USSR was established. Rumer became Director of its Institute of Radiophysics and Pokrovsky became an academy scientist, where he remained until 1966.

In 1966, Pokrovsky was invited to join the newly founded Landau Institute for Theoretical Physics in Chernogolovka. He also worked with researchers at Moscow Institute of Physics and Technology. In 1990, he spent a six-month sabbatical with Heiner Müller-Krumbhaar at the Condensed Matter Division of the Institute of Nuclear Physics in Jülich, Germany. In 1992, Pokrovsky became a professor of physics at Texas A&M University in the United States, while remaining a Senior Scientist at the Landau Institute.

== Research ==
His areas of research are quantum mechanics, statistical physics, and condensed matter theory. He is best known for his pioneering and fundamental contributions to the modern theory of phase transitions, together with Alexander Patashinski, in 1965, as well as the analysis of transformations between commensurate and incommensurate superstructures in two-dimensional systems, the Pokrovsky-Talapov transition.

== Awards ==
Valery Pokrovsky received several awards, including twice receiving the Landau Prize of the Soviet Academy of Science:first in 1984 with Alexander Patashinski for work on phase transition theory and second in 2018 “for fundamental contribution to statistical physics and quantum mechanics.” He became a Fellow of the American Physical Society in 1999, and received the Humboldt Prize in 2000. He was awarded the Lars Onsager Prize of the American Physical Society in 2005 "For fundamental and original contributions to statistical physics, including development of the scaling theory for correlation functions near critical points and of theories for commensurate-incommensurate phase transitions."

== Selected publications ==
- A. Z. Patashinskii, V. L. Pokrovskii, Fluctuation Theory of Phase Transitions, Pergamon Press, 1979; ISBN 0080216641
- Pokrovsky, V. L.; Talapov, A. L. (1979). "Ground-state, spectrum, and phase-diagram of 2-dimensional incommensurate crystals". Physical Review Letters. 42 (1): 65–67. Bibcode:1979PhRvL..42...65P. doi:10.1103/PhysRevLett.42.65.
