= Arkady Migdal =

Soviet physicist (1911–1991)

- Born: 11 March 1911; Lida, Russian Empire (now Lida, Belarus)
- Died: 9 February 1991 (aged 79); Princeton, USA
- Education: Leningrad State University
- Known for: Landau–Pomeranchuk–Migdal effect Migdal–Kohn singularity Landau–Migdal parameters Pion condensation
- Children: Alexander Migdal
- Scientific career
- Fields: Theoretical physics
- Workplaces: Leningrad Institute of Physics and Technology; Institute for Physical Problems; Moscow Engineering Physics Institute; Kurchatov Institute; Landau Institute for Theoretical Physics
- Thesis: (1943)
- Doctoral advisor: Matvei Bronstein; Vladimir Fock
- Doctoral students: Anatoly Larkin

Arkady Beynusovich (Benediktovich) Migdal (Russian: Арка́дий Бе́йнусович (Бенеди́ктович) Мигда́л; Lida, Russian Empire, 11 March 1911 – Princeton, United States, 9 February 1991) was a Soviet physicist and member of the Academy of Sciences of the Soviet Union. He developed the formula that accounts for the Landau–Pomeranchuk–Migdal effect, a reduction of the bremsstrahlung and pair production cross sections at high energies or high matter densities.

== Biography ==
Arkady Migdal, whose father was a Jewish pharmacist, graduated from secondary school in Petrograd. In 1927 he published his first physics paper. He studied at Leningrad State University but was expelled in 1931 for his "non-proletarian origin". In 1933 he was arrested and imprisoned for 70 days. He graduated from Leningrad State University in 1936 with a Russian Candidate of Sciences degree (Ph.D.). His thesis advisor was Vladimir Fock. Migdal was a postdoc at the Leningrad Institute of Physics and Technology, where his supervisor was Matvei Bronstein, and Yakov Frenkel was the chief of the theory department. From 1938 Migdal worked with Lev Landau at Moscow's Institute for Physical Problems, received there in 1943 his Russian Doctor of Sciences degree (habilitation), and was employed there until 1945. In 1944 Migdal also became a professor at National Research Nuclear University MEPhI (Moscow Engineering Physics Institute) (Национальный исследовательский ядерный университет "МИФИ", MIFI). From 1945 to 1971 Migdal was employed at Moscow's Kurchatov Institute, where he later became head of the theory department. From 1971 until his death in 1991 Migdal was a professor at the Landau Institute for Theoretical Physics of the Academy of Sciences of the Soviet Union in Moscow. His doctoral students include Anatoly Larkin.

In 1945 Migdal became a participant in the Soviet atomic project. At a meeting on November 30, 1945, instructions were given to a group of scientists, including Migdal, Abram Alikhanov (as chair), Lev Landau, Yulii Khariton, Samuil Reinberg, Mikhail Sadovsky, Sergei Sergeyevich Vasilyev, and Aleksandr Zakoshchikov, to analyze all available materials on the consequences of the use of atomic bombs in Hiroshima and Nagasaki and to determine the effectiveness of the blast factor, heat factor, and radiation factor.

In the early 1950s Migdal was one of the outstanding participants in the Landau seminars. He did important research in atomic and nuclear physics, quantum field theory, metal theory and other problems of modern theoretical physics. Using the methods of many-body theory in nuclear physics, he obtained important results in the theory of moments of inertia of the atomic nucleus. Using the ideas of the Fermi-liquid theory to describe finite systems, he and his colleagues were the first to quantitatively described important properties of nuclei — magnetic and quadrupole moments, isotopic shift, radiative transitions, and giant resonance in photo absorption. In 1954 he developed a rigorous quantum electrodynamic theory of bremsstrahlung and pair formation in media. In 1959 he suggested that the nuclear matter in neutron stars is a liquid in a superfluid state.

Migdal was awarded the Order of Lenin, the Order of the October Revolution, and, in three different years, the Order of the Red Banner of Labour.

He was active in mountaineering. For many years he was engaged in scuba diving. In 1959 he became the first chairman of the USSR Underwater Sports Federation with Sergey Kapitsa as the deputy. In 1957 Migdal organized an underwater expedition to study the flora and fauna of the Black Sea. Together with S.P. Kapitsa and others, he designed and implemented the first scuba gear in the USSR.

He produced three well-known underwater films and was an appreciated TV popularizer of science.

In a 1977 interview, Migdal said:

As a post graduate student at that time, it was in ‘36, I attended the Leningrad Physical-Technical Institute, and one of the post graduate students was Berestetskii who later wrote this well-known book about quantum electrodynamics. Then, Pomeranchuk, then Shmushkevitch. It was a good group and all these people were very involved in science and we’d speak only about science, and it was the whole day and the whole night sometimes. The most popular topic was the theory of metals. At that time, every physicist supposed that it was the main and the most important part of theoretical physics, metal theory.

In 1942 Artem Alikhanian and Abram Alikhanov went on an expedition into Yerevan to study cosmic rays. Toward the end of WWII, Landau, Pomeranchuk, and Migdal did some theoretical research on cosmic rays, concerning the theory of Auger showers.

Migdal was elected in 1953 a corresponding member and in 1966 a full member of the Academy of Sciences of the Soviet Union.

His son, Alexander Arkadyevich Migdal, is also a renowned physicist.

== Books ==
=== Russian editions ===
- Теория конечных ферми-систем и свойства атомных ядер. (Theory of finite Fermi systems and properties of atomic nuclei) М. ("М." represents "Москва", i.e., "Moscow".), 1965;
- Приближенные методы квантовой механики. (Approximate methods of quantum mechanics) М., 1966; совм. с В. П. Крайновым (coauthored with V. P. Krainov)
- Метод квазичастиц в теории ядра. (Method of quasiparticles in nuclear theory) М., 1967.
- Качественные методы в квантовой теории. (Qualitative methods in quantum theory) — М.: «Наука» (Nauka). Главная редакция физико-математической литературы (Main edition of physical and mathematical literature), 1975. 336 с. (Here "с.' represents "страницы", i.e., "pages".)
- Фермионы и бозоны в сильных полях. (Fermions and bosons in strong fields) М., 1978.
- Поиски истины. (The search for truth) — М.: Молодая гвардия (Molodaya Gvardiya), 1983. — 239 с., ил. (Here"ил." represents the Russian word for "illustrated".) — Эврика (Eureka book series)
- Как рождаются физические теории. (How physical theories are born) М., 1984.
- Квантовая физика для больших и маленьких. (Quantum physics for big and small) — М.: Наука, 1989. 144 с., ISBN 5-02-013880-0.
- От догадки до истины. (From conjecture to truth) М., 2008.

=== English translations ===
- Migdal, A. B. (1967). Theory of Finite Systems and Applications to Atomic Nuclei. New York: Interscience. ISBN 9780470602454. (translated by Seweryn Chomet)
- Migdal, Arkadiĭ Beĭnusovich (1968). Nuclear Theory: The Quasiparticle Method. W. A. Benjamin; 142 pages (translated by Anthony J. Leggett, according to p. iii)
- Arkadiĭ Beĭnusovich Migdal & Vladimir Pavlovich Kraĭnov (1968). Approximation methods of quantum mechanics. translation from Russian by Irene Verona Schensted. NEO Press.
- Migdal, A.B. (1977). Qualitative methods in quantum theory. W. A. Benjamin. ISBN 0-8053-7064-1. (translated by Anthony J. Leggett, according to page v) Quantum Theory of Many-Particle Systems. Courier Corporation. 8 March 2012. ISBN 9780486134758.
