= Emily Stone (mathematician) =

American mathematician

Emily Foster Stone is an American mathematician whose research includes work in fluid dynamics and dynamical systems. She is a professor of mathematics at the University of Montana, where she chairs the Department of Mathematical Sciences. She previously served as the chair of the Activity Group on Dynamical Systems of the Society for Industrial and Applied Mathematics.

== Education ==
Stone majored in physics at the University of California, Santa Cruz, graduating in 1984. She completed her Ph.D. in theoretical and applied mechanics at Cornell University in 1989; her dissertation, A Study of Low-Dimensional Models for the Wall Region of a Turbulent Boundary Layer, was supervised by Philip Holmes.

== Career ==
Stone taught at Arizona State University from 1992 to 1993, and at Utah State University from 1993 to 2004, before joining the University of Montana faculty in 2004.

== Service ==
Stone was elected as chair of the Activity Group on Dynamical Systems (SIAG-DS) of the Society for Industrial and Applied Mathematics (SIAM) in 2020. She was elected Vice Chair of the same SIAG in 2022.

== Selected publications ==
- Aubry, Nadine; Holmes, Philip; Lumley, John L.; Stone, Emily (July 1988), "The dynamics of coherent structures in the wall region of a turbulent boundary layer", Journal of Fluid Mechanics, 192: 115–173, Bibcode:1988JFM...192..115A, doi:10.1017/s0022112088001818, S2CID 122066384
- Stone, Emily; Holmes, Philip (June 1990), "Random perturbations of heteroclinic attractors", SIAM Journal on Applied Mathematics, 50 (3): 726–743, doi:10.1137/0150043
- Leary, G. P.; Stone, E. F.; Holley, D. C.; Kavanaugh, M. P. (March 2007), "The glutamate and chloride permeation pathways are colocalized in individual neuronal glutamate transporter subunits", The Journal of Neuroscience, 27 (11): 2938–2942, doi:10.1523/jneurosci.4851-06.2007, PMC 6672579, PMID 17360916
