= Patricia Goldman-Rakic =

American neuroscientist

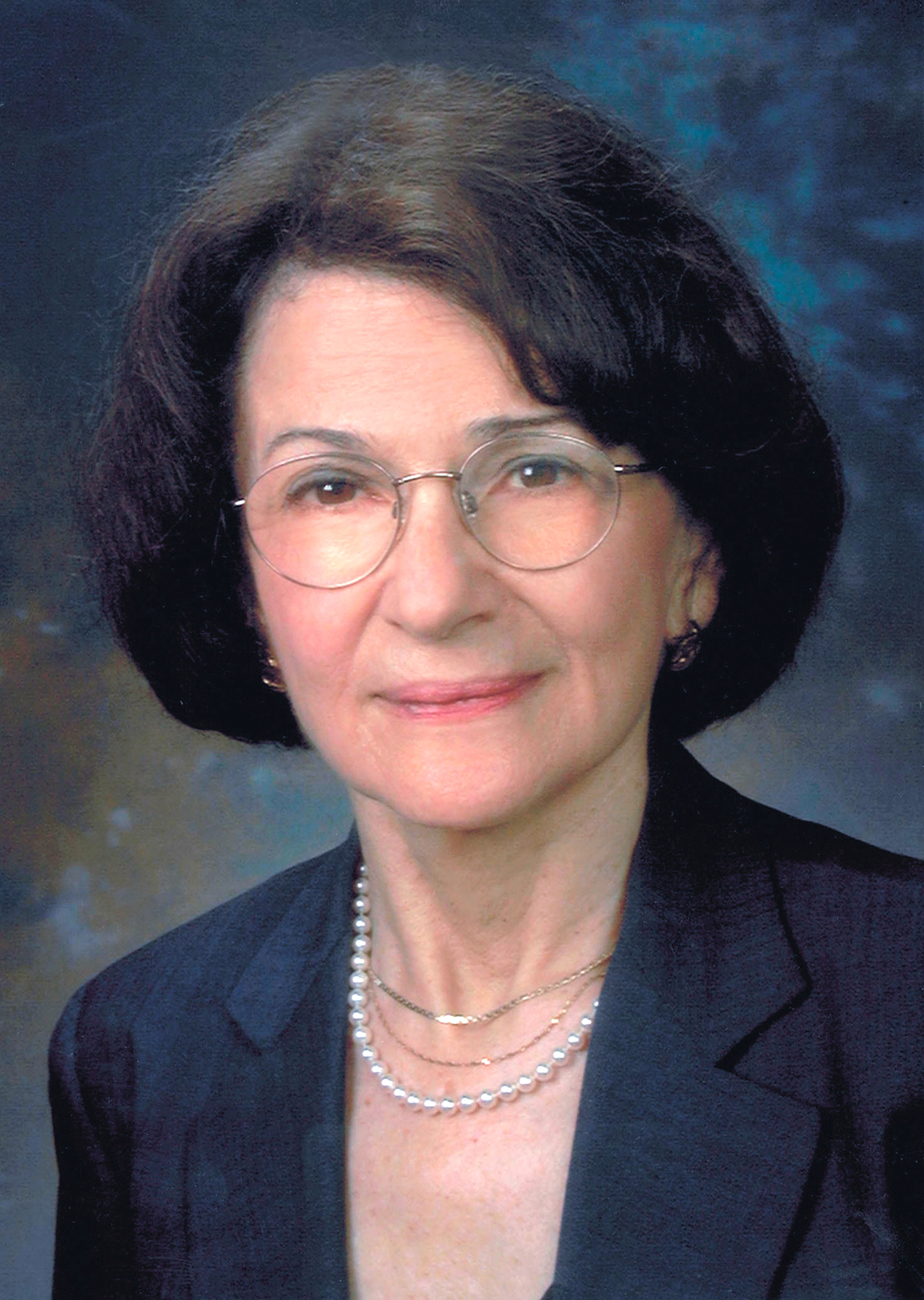
- Born: Patricia Shoer; April 22, 1937; Salem, Massachusetts, United States
- Died: July 31, 2003 (aged 66); Hamden, Connecticut, United States
- Education: Vassar, UCLA
- Awards: List: National Institute of Mental Health grantee (1980–2000); W. Alden Spencer Award, Columbia University (1982); Krieg Cortical Discoverer Award, Cajal Club (1989); inducted National Academy of Sciences (1990); Fyssen Foundation Prize in Neuroscience (1990); Lieber Prize, National Alliance for Research on Schizophrenia and Depression (1991); inducted American Academy of Arts and Sciences (1991); Robert J. and Claire Pasarow Foundation Award (1993); Karl Spencer Lashley Award, American Philosophical Society (1996); Ariëns Kappers Medal, Royal Netherlands Academy of Arts and Sciences (1996); honorary doctorate, Utrecht University (2000); Gerard Prize, Society for Neuroscience (2002); Source: Yale News:
- Scientific career
- Fields: Neurobiology
- Workplaces: Yale University
- Doctoral advisor: Wendell Jeffrey

Patricia Goldman-Rakic (/rəˈkiːʃ/ rə-KEESH; née Shoer, April 22, 1937 – July 31, 2003) was an American professor of neuroscience, neurology, psychiatry and psychology at Yale University School of Medicine. She pioneered multidisciplinary research of the prefrontal cortex and working memory.

== Early life and education ==
Patricia Shoer was born in Salem, Massachusetts. Her father, Irving Shoer, was the son of Latvian immigrants and her mother, Jenny Pearl, was a Ukrainian immigrant from Ostroh (which was an occupied land by the Russian Empire at the time). She grew up in Peabody, Massachusetts and attended Peabody High School. Goldman-Rakic earned her bachelor's degree cum laude in neurobiology from Vassar in 1959, and her doctorate from the University of California at Los Angeles in experimental Developmental Psychology in 1963.

After postdoctoral positions at UCLA and New York University, Goldman-Rakic worked at the National Institute of Mental Health in neuropsychology starting in 1965 and later as Chief of Developmental Neurobiology from 1975-1979. She moved to Yale School of Medicine in 1979 where she remained until her death. She was The Eugene Higgins Professor of Neuroscience in the neurobiology department with joint appointments in the departments of psychiatry, neurology, and psychology. In 1988 she was granted a five-year, $6 million grant to establish the Center for Neuroscience Research at Yale.

== Research ==
Goldman-Rakic was the first to discover and describe the circuitry of the prefrontal cortex and its relationship to working memory. Previously, scientists thought that the higher cognitive functions of the prefrontal cortex were beyond the scope of scientific study. Goldman-Rakic's research showed that methods employed to study the sensory cortices could be adapted to the highest order prefrontal cortical areas, revealing the circuit basis for higher cognitive function. Because of Goldman-Rakic, scientists began to better understand the neurobiological basis of higher cognitive function, and of such disorders as schizophrenia, Alzheimer's, Attention deficit hyperactivity disorder (ADHD), cerebral palsy, Parkinson's disease, and dementia. She used a multidisciplinary approach, applying biochemical, electrophysiological, pharmacological, anatomical and behavioral techniques to study working memory. She pioneered the first studies of dopamine influences on prefrontal cortical function, research that is critical to our understanding of schizophrenia, ADHD and Parkinson's disease. A review of her life's work, including her special role mentoring women scientists, can be found in Neuron.

Goldman-Rakic co-authored over 300 scholarly articles and co-edited 3 books. She co-founded the Cerebral Cortex Journal, a specialized publication by Oxford Press, with her husband Dr. Pasko Rakic. Early in her career, she studied the capacity of the brain to repair itself in early development, and was one of the first to use radioactive tracers to examine this phenomenon.

She used microelectrode recording in her research and challenged the traditional notion that memory was not controlled or involved in the frontal lobe; she asserted that working memory was in its own structure apart from long-term memory.

== Personal life ==
Goldman-Rakic had two sisters, Dr. Ruth Rappaport, her identical twin, and Dr. Linda Faith Schoer. She was married to Dr. Lawrence Goldman. She re-married Pasko Rakic, also a neuroscientist, in 1979.

== Death ==
On July 29, 2003, Goldman-Rakic was struck by a car while crossing a street in Hamden, Connecticut. She died two days later, on July 31 at Yale-New Haven Hospital. She is buried in Grove Street Cemetery.

In memory of Goldman-Rakic, Constance and Stephen Lieber created the Goldman-Rakic Prize for Outstanding Achievement in Cognitive Neuroscience to celebrate her memory and her discoveries about the brain's frontal lobe. This prize is awarded every year to outstanding scientists, from psychiatrist to molecular neuroscientist, for their impact on the study of cognition. The prize carries an award of $40,000 and the winners are honored at the annual International Awards Dinner in New York City.

== Honors and awards ==
- George Peabody Award (1954)
- National Institute of Mental Health grantee (1980–2000)
- W. Alden Spencer Award, Columbia University (1982)
- Krieg Cortical Discoverer Award, Cajal Club (1989)
- Inducted National Academy of Sciences (1990)
- Fyssen Foundation Prize in Neuroscience (1990)
- Merit Award of NIMH (1990)
- Lieber Prize, National Alliance for Research on Schizophrenia and Depression (1991)
- Inducted American Academy of Arts and Sciences (1991)
- Robert J. and Claire Pasarow Foundation Medical Research Award (1993)
- John P. McGovern Award in Behavioral Sciences (American Association for the Advancement of Science) (1993)
- Karl Lashley Award, American Philosophical Society (1996)
- Ariëns Kappers Medal, Royal Netherlands Academy of Arts and Sciences (1996)
- Honorary doctorate, Utrecht University (2000)
- Ralph Gerard Prize, Society for Neuroscience (2002)
- Gold Medal for Distinguished Scientific Contributions, American Psychological Association (2002)
- Honorary degree, St. Andrews College of the University of Edinburgh (2003)
- Inducted to the Connecticut Women’s Hall of Fame, Science & Health category (2008)

Goldman-Rakic was also the president of the Society for Neuroscience from 1989 to 1990 and a fellow of The American Psychological Association.
