= Yury Bunkov =

Russian physicist

Yury (or Yuriy or Yuri) Mikhailovich Bunkov (Юрий Михайлович Буньков, 29 August 1950 – 4 October 2026) (source) was a Russian experimental physicist specializing in condensed matter physics. He was known as one of the co-discoverers of the quantum spin liquid state. https://kpfu.ru/physics/kollektiv-instituta-fiziki-s-priskorbiem-493243.html

== Education and career ==
Bunkov, born into a family of geologists, graduated in 1968 from a special school for physics and mathematics in Moscow (School No. 2). In 1968 he also achieved first place in the Moscow Physics Olympiad and matriculated at the Moscow Institute of Physics and Technology (MIPT), which was headed by Piotr Kapitza.

According to Bunkov, the "parametric echo" should be called the "Bunkov echo":

As a student I observed and explained the "parametric echo", now named the Bunkov echo. That is the echo signal seen in magnetically ordered materials after a single resonance and a single parametric pulse.

In 1974 he matriculated at the Kapitza Institute for Physical Problems, where he received in 1979 his Candidate of Sciences degree (Ph.D.). A. S. Borovik-Romanov was Bunkov's thesis advisor. At the Kapitza Institute for Physical Problems, he was employed as a non-principal scientist from 1979 to 1985, a principal scientist from 1985 to 1986, and from 1986 to 1995 as a leading scientist. At the Kapitza Institute he constructed the Soviet Union's first nuclear demagnetization refrigerator.

In 1983 at the Kapitza Institute, quantum spin superfluidity was discovered by Bunkov, who was the team leader, with Vladimir Dmitriev and Yuri Mukharsky (who worked at the Kapitza Institute as students). Spin superfluidity manifested itself in NMR studies on ^{3}helium-B as regions of coherent Larmor precession (regions known as HPDs, Homogeneously Precessing Domains), with inhomogeneities in the precession caused by supercurrents in the spin (based on magnetization) similar to those in superconductivity (based on charge-supercurrent) and superliquid or Bose-Einstein condensates (based on mass-supercurrent). Spin superfluidity is also a Bose-Einstein condensate (BEC) of magnons. A theoretical explanation was given in the 1980s by the theorist Igor Akindinovich Fomin.

Bunkov wrote concerning his work at the Kapitza Institute:

In 1982 our group succeeded in cooling ^{3}He into the superfluid state and in the following year we discovered spin superfluidity, the superflow of ^{3}He magnetization with no mass current. We observed the formation of a magnetically coherent state which is now considered a Bose-Einstein condensation of magnons. We also observed the magnetic Josephson effect, critical spin supercurrent, phase slippage and other spin coherent phenomena.

... The first magnonic superfluid state was discovered in 1984 by A. S. Borovik-Romanov and Yu. M. Bunkov experimental group and described theoretically by I. Fomin as a new state of magnetically ordered matter ... It was observed as the spontaneously self-organized phase-coherent precession of spins in an antiferromagnetic superfluid ^{3}He-B. This state fulfills all criteria of coherence, suggested later by Snoke ... It is radically different from the conventional ordered states in magnets. It is the quasi-equilibrium one, which emerges on the background of the ordered magnetic state, and which can be described in terms of the condensation of magnetic excitations to a coherent quantum state ...

At the Kapitza Institute, he received in 1985 his Russian Doctor of Sciences degree (habilitation) with a thesis on NMR studies on superfluid helium-3. At Grenoble's Institut Néel (formerly called CRTBT), belonging to the Centre National de la Recherche Scientifique (CNRS), he was employed from 1995 to 2004 as a Directeur de Recherche and since 2004 is employed as a Directeur de Recherche de 1^{er} classe. From 2008 to the present, he is a part-time professor at Kazan Federal University.

For many years Bunkov participated in the Soviet-Finnish project ROTA, in which the researchers discovered many different types of ^{3}He vortices. He also made many visits (from 1989 to 1995) to Lancaster University, where he participated in NMR experiments at record-setting low temperatures for ^{3}He.

At CRTBT his research group cooled ^{3}He to 100 K and, at such low temperatures, found in 1996 an energy deficit after a ^{3}He neutron capture reaction. The energy deficit "appeared to arise from vortex creation via the Kibble-Zurek cosmological mechanism, in analogy with cosmic-string creation in the early Universe." He became the leader of the project ULTIMA (Ultra Low Temperature Instrumentation for Measurements in Astrophysics), which has as its purpose the development of a dark-matter detector based on overcooled superfluid ^{3}He.

In the ^{3}He-B phase (which has a complex phase structure) he experimentally discovered analogues to cosmological and quantum field theoretical phenomena, such as cosmological strings (as vortices in the spin supercurrent) and Majorana quasiparticles. In the 1980s he and his colleagues detected Goldstone modes (as phonons in the spin-superfluidity HPDs analogous to the second sound phenomena in superfluids). In the 2000s he discovered Q-balls] in superfluid ^{3}He. (The concept of a Q-ball, a type of non-topological soliton, was originally introduced in quantum field theory.)

He collaborated extensively with the theorist Grigori Efimovich Volovik. In 2008, Bunkov and his Japanese colleagues discovered coherent precession in the helium-3-A phase embedded in uniaxially deformed anisotropic aerogels.

Bunkov is internationally recognized for his research on quantum fluids and solids, superfluid ^{3}He nuclear magnetic resonance {NMR), and oltra-low temperatures techniques and their application to cosmology and the search for dark matter. As of the end of 2018 his Hirsch index was 26.

Bunkov received in 1993 the State Prize of the Russian Federation "for the discovery of magnetic superfluidity and the Homogeneously Precessing Domain". In 2001 Bunkov was made Doctor "Honoris Causa" by Pavol Jozef Šafárik University in Košice, Slovakia. In 2008 he was awarded, jointly with Vladimir Dmitriev and Igor A. Fomin, the Fritz London Memorial Prize for their discovery and elucidation of "unique phenomena in superfluid ^{3}He-B: macroscopi phase-coherent spin precession and the flow of spin supercurrent." Bunkov has been a full member of the Academia Europaea since 2010.

== Selected publications ==
- with A.S. Borovik-Romanov, V.V. Dmitriev, Yu.M. Mukharskiĭ: Long-lived induction signal in superfluid in ^{3}-He, JETP Lett., vol. 40, no. 6, 1984, pp. 1033–1037 (translated by Dave Parsons) pdf
- with V.V. Dmitriev, Yu.M. Mukharskiy: Twist oscillations of homogeneous precession domain in ^{3}He-B, JETP Lett., vol. 43, 1986, pp. 168–171. (Goldstone mode)
- with A. S. Borovik-Romanov: Spin supercurrent and magnetic relaxation in Helium-3, Harwood Academic Publ. 1990.
- with V.V.Dmitriev, Yu.M. Mukharskiy, Low frequency oscillations of the homogeneously precessing domain in ^{3}He-B, Physica B, vol. 178, 1992, pp. 196–201. doi:10.1016/0921-4526(92)90198-2 (Goldstone mode)
- Persistent signal; coherent NMR state trapped by orbital texture, J. Low Temp. Phys., vol. 138, 2005, pp. 753–758, doi:10.1007/s10909-005-2298-8 (Q-Ball)
- with G.E. Volovik: Magnon condensation into a Q-ball in ^{3}He-B, Phys. Rev. Lett., vol. 98, 2007, p. 265302. doi:10.1103/PhysRevLett.98.265302
- Spin Supercurrent, J. of Magnetism and Magnetic Materials (2007 article published in 2018). arXiv:cond-mat/0701182
- with T. Sato, T. Kunimatsu, K. Izumina, A. Matsubara, M. Kubota, T. Mizusaki: Coherent precession of magnetization in the superfluid ^{3}He A-phase, Phys. Rev. Lett., vol. 101, 2008, p. 055301. doi:10.1103/PhysRevLett.101.055301
- with G. E. Volovik: Bose-Einstein Condensation of Magnons in Superfluid ^{3}He, J. Low Temperature Physics, vol. 150, 2008, pp. 135–144. doi:10.1007/s10909-007-9530-7
- with G.E. Volovik: Magnon BEC in superfluid ^{3}He-A, JETP Lett., vol. 89, 2009, pp. 306–310. doi:10.1134/S0021364009060101
- with G. E. Volovik: Magnon BEC and spin superfluidity: a ^{3}He primer, arXiv:0904.3889
- Spin superfluidity and magnons Bose-Einstein-Condensation, Physics Uspekhi, August 2010, doi:10.3367/UFNe.0180.201008m.0884
- with G. E. Volovik: Spin superfluidity and magnon BEC, in: Int. Ser. Monogr. Phys. 156, 2013, pp. 253–311, arXiv:1003.4889
- with Rasul Gazizuzin: Observation of Majorana Quasiparticles Surface States in Superfluid ^{3}He-B by Heat Capacity Measurements, arXiv:1605.05203
- with Vladimir Safonov: Magnon Condensation and Spin Superfluidity, arXiv:1702.00846
- with A. Farhutdinov. A. Kuzmichev, T. R. Safin, P. M. Vetoshko, V. I. Belotelov. and V. I. Tagirov: The magnonic superfluid droplet at room temperature. arXiv:1911.03708
- Magnonic Superfluidity Versus Bose Condensation, Appl. Magn. Reson. vol. 51, 2020, pp. 1711–1721. doi:10.1007/s00723-020-01223-z
- with A. N. Kuzmichev, T. R. Safin, P. M. Vetoshko, V. I. Belotelov, and M. S. Tagirov: Quantum paradigm of the foldover magnetic resonance, Scientific Reports, vol. 11, no. 1, 2021, pp. 1–8. doi:10.1038/s41598-021-87196-w
