= Alexander Migdal =

Russian-American physicist (b. 1945)

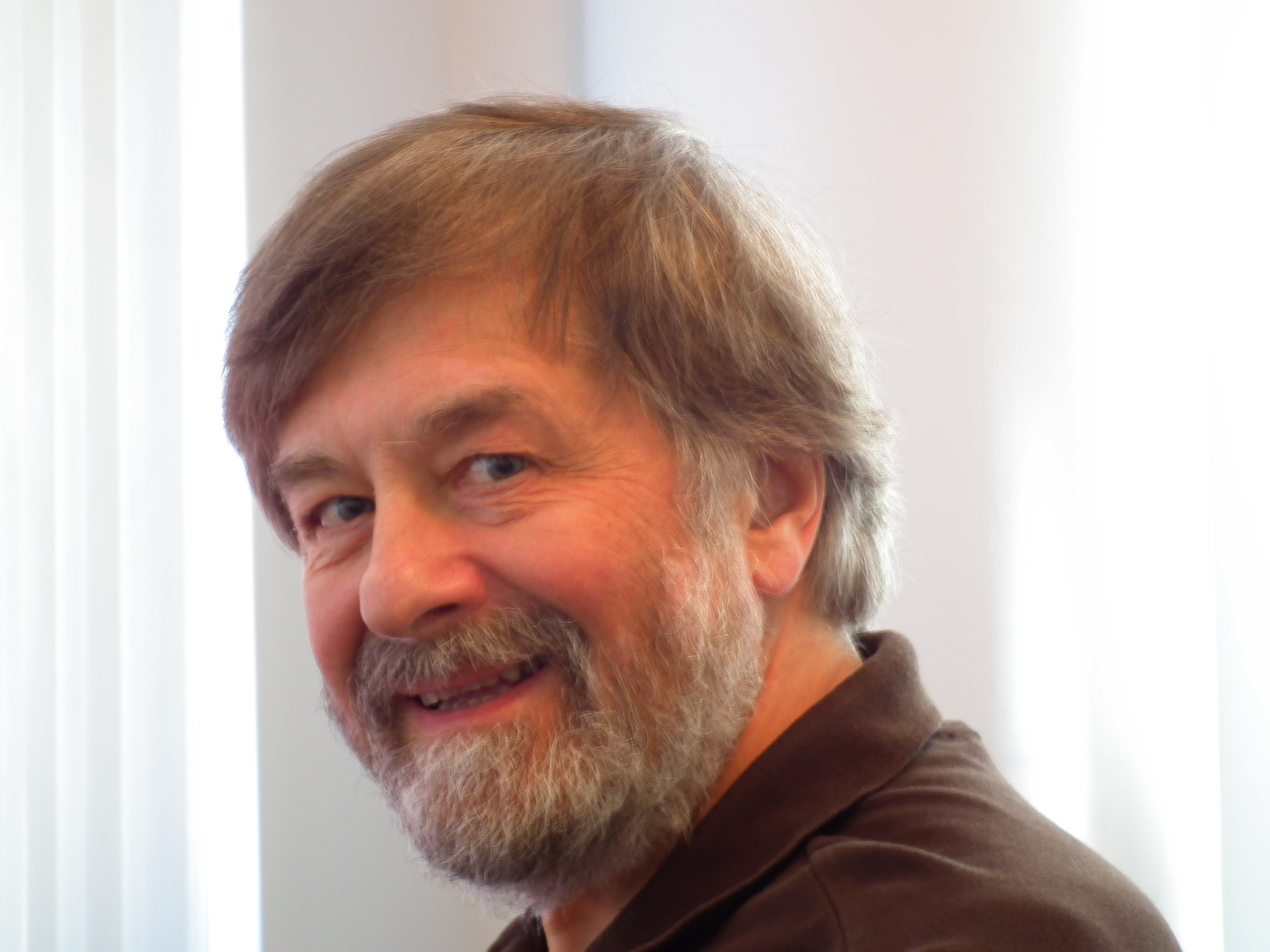
- Born: Alexander Arkadyevich Migdal; 22 July 1945 (age 81); Moscow, Soviet Union
- Education: Moscow Institute of Physics and Technology; Landau Institute for Theoretical Physics
- Known for: Reggeon field theory Migdal–Polyakov bootstrap Migdal–Kadanoff recursion Makeenko–Migdal loop equation Two-dimensional Yang–Mills theory
- Father: Arkady Migdal
- Scientific career
- Fields: Theoretical Physics; Mathematical Physics
- Workplaces: Landau Institute for Theoretical Physics; Princeton University; New York University; New York University Abu Dhabi; Institute for Advanced Study

Alexander "Sasha" Arkadyevich Migdal (Russian: Александр Арка́дьевич Мигдал; born 22 July 1945) is a Russian-American mathematical and theoretical physicist currently working at the Institute for Advanced Study in Princeton, New Jersey. He is known for the Makeenko–Migdal loop equation, an exact equation for Wilson loops in quantum chromodynamics with a large number of colors, which has been a basis for studies of quark confinement.

== Early life and education ==
Alexander Migdal was born in Moscow, Soviet Union in 1945, the son of prominent Soviet physicist Arkady Migdal.

Migdal studied physics and mathematics as an undergraduate at Moscow Institute of Physics and Technology before receiving his PhD in theoretical physics from the Landau Institute for Theoretical Physics in 1969. He defended his doctoral degree (Doctor of Sciences) at the Landau Institute in 1973, according to his website.

In a 2003 interview, Alexander Polyakov recalled that when he entered the institute, at the age of 15, he and Migdal passed the first of Lev Landau's examinations, which he said was the mathematics examination, and that this was the only occasion on which he met Landau, shortly before Landau's accident. Migdal has given a similar account, placing the examination in the spring of 1961, after he and Polyakov had shared first prize in a mathematical olympiad, and describing it as the first step of the "Theoretical Minimum" examination system of Landau's school.

Migdal left the Soviet Union in 1988.

== Career ==
Alexander Migdal began his academic career as a researcher in theoretical physics at the Landau Institute, which he joined in 1969.

Migdal has stated that his last international symposium was in 1976, after which he was approached by the KGB and rejected its offer.

Following his departure from the Soviet Union, Migdal spent a year at the University of California, San Diego, and in 1989 joined Princeton University as a joint professor of physics and of applied and computational mathematics, according to a 2000 profile in U.S. 1 Newspaper. Princeton's Office of the Dean of the Faculty, in its biography of Alexander Polyakov, likewise states that Polyakov joined the physics department in 1989 and that Migdal joined the department that year as well. Migdal remained at Princeton until 1996, when he left to found Real Time Geometry, a developer of three-dimensional laser scanning.

According to U.S. 1 Newspaper, Real Time Geometry was founded in 1996 by Migdal and Bob Rice, opened in Princeton that year, and was sold in December 1996 to MetaTools, a Santa Barbara software company. A 1997 report described it as a Princeton University spin-off founded by Migdal, and the company's patent filings date from 1996; a Macworld chronology likewise dates the acquisition to 1996. In 1997 MetaTools merged with Fractal Design and other firms to form MetaCreations, and MetaStream, a three-dimensional streaming format for the Web, was derived from Real Time Geometry's technology. Migdal continued to work at MetaCreations, and in 1999 he was a co-author of a conference paper on MetaStream. A Web 3D newsletter reported in November 1999 that Popular Science had named MetaStream a winner of its 1999 "Best of What's New" award, and U.S. 1 Newspaper reported in 2000 that the previous year's version of the software had won the award. A WeWork profile describes the award-winning tool as one for zooming, panning and rotating three-dimensional images in a web browser.

Migdal is named as an inventor on at least twelve granted United States patents assigned to Real-Time Geometry Corporation or, for later filings, to Viewpoint Corporation. They cover laser-stripe three-dimensional scanning systems, the construction of mesh models of three-dimensional objects, and the compression and transmission of moving-picture data, with filings dating from 1996 to 2000. A WeWork profile gives his patent count as ten, in laser scanning and three-dimensional data compression and transmission.

In 1998 Migdal founded Tachyon Systems, a Princeton company developing software for real-time analysis of stock market data, together with Keith Danko and Ward Tomlinson. According to his personal website, he served as vice chairman and chief scientist of a public company until March 2000, then worked for almost 20 years on a stock trading system before returning to physics. A 2016 WeWork profile states that Migdal started four companies in total and sold the first three, and a biography published by the International Centre for Theoretical Sciences for his 2023 lecture likewise states that he founded four companies, the latest being Migdal Research LLC, which it describes as dedicated to stock market prediction. A limited liability company named Migdal Research LLC was incorporated in New Jersey on 20 June 2013, according to OpenCorporates, which does not list its members. A Russian-language biography published by the Saint Petersburg teachers' association describes him as chief executive of Migdal Research LLC, which it says works on stock market forecasting, and lists Viewpoint Corp and Magic Works LLC among the companies he worked for.

Migdal returned to academia in 2019 as a research professor at New York University; his website gives the date of the appointment as October 2019, and a University of Luxembourg biography also gives 2019. In March 2019 he posted the first of a series of preprints on the area law and loop equation in turbulence, and in a preprint of December 2019 he acknowledged support from a Simons Foundation award at New York University. He had first studied turbulence in 1993.

In August 2021 Arab News reported that the Abu Dhabi Investment Authority (ADIA), the sovereign wealth fund of Abu Dhabi in the United Arab Emirates, had appointed Migdal as one of the global heads leading the research team of its quantitative research and development group. He was still working there in 2022: a long review of loop equations in turbulence, published in Physics Reports in 2023, states that the project was completed while he was working at ADIA, and acknowledges support from a Simons Foundation award at New York University Abu Dhabi.

Migdal's 2023 papers on decaying turbulence list the Department of Physics at New York University Abu Dhabi as his affiliation, and the International Centre for Theoretical Sciences identified him with the same institution when he lectured there in December 2023.

Migdal joined the Institute for Advanced Study as a member in September 2024. According to the Institute's profile, he was a member of the School of Mathematics for 2024–2025 and for 2025–2026, and is a member of the School of Natural Sciences from August 2026 to July 2027. The profile lists his fields of study as quantum field theory and turbulence and states an interest in quantum chromodynamics and quantum gravity.

== Scientific work ==
Migdal has made contributions to quantum field theory, quantum gravity and the study of turbulence.

As undergraduates, Migdal and Alexander Polyakov worked on dynamical mass generation in gauge theories, independently of Robert Brout, François Englert and Peter Higgs. Migdal has said that the discovery dates from 1964 and that their paper, Spontaneous Breakdown of Strong Interaction Symmetry and Absence of Massless Particles, was rejected twice by JETP. The Royal Swedish Academy of Sciences' scientific background for the 2013 Nobel Prize in Physics states that the two had to struggle for about a year to obtain permission to submit the paper because leading Soviet scientists of the time did not support it, that it was submitted in November 1965, and that it was completely independent of developments in the West. The background describes the paper as a calculation to all orders in perturbation theory, using a Bethe–Salpeter equation, in a spontaneously broken non-abelian gauge model with a scalar bound state, and as an independent confirmation of the second of the two mechanisms proposed by Englert and Brout. The paper was published in 1966.

Between 1967 and 1973, Migdal was active primarily in the area of critical phenomena and scale invariance and conformal field theory, beginning with his seminal paper from 1967 written with Vladimir Gribov connecting critical phenomena and quantum field theory. This work was subsequently developed by Migdal and Polyakov, working independently, into the Migdal–Polyakov conformal bootstrap, and was a precursor to the work for which Ken Wilson was awarded the Nobel Prize in 1982. The conformal bootstrap was further developed by Polyakov, Vyacheslav Rychkov and others into what is now recognized as the preferred quantitative microscopic theory for understanding critical phenomena.

Migdal's work from 1974 to 1980 was focused on quantum chromodynamics, starting with a paper from 1975 in which he was first to establish how asymptotic freedom could lead to quark confinement by employing a novel form of the renormalization group. This work was popularized by Ken Wilson and Leo Kadanoff and later became known as the "Migdal–Kadanoff bond-moving approximation," with lasting application in solid-state physics. In 1979, Migdal and his student Yuri Makeenko derived an exact equation for the Wilson loop in QCD with a large number of colors (large N), now known as the Makeenko–Migdal loop equation. Makeenko and Migdal developed it further in a 1981 paper, and Migdal reviewed the loop equations and the 1/N expansion in 1983. The equation is now widely used in quantum chromodynamics to study quark confinement and has been a basis for string models of QCD. More recently, Migdal has found an asymptotic solution of this loop equation for large loop areas, which describes the confining force between a quark and an antiquark; the work was published in Nuclear Physics B in 2026.

In the 1980s, Migdal (Phys. Reports '83) applied the matrix model to the string topological expansion of large N QCD, then Vladimir Kazakov and F. David found that matrix models could be applied to topological quantum field theories such as quantum gravity. Initial results obtained by Migdal in collaboration with Vladimir A. Kazakov showed that a triangulated planar matrix model was exactly equivalent to a continuum gravity model by Knizhnik, Polyakov and Zamolodchikov (KPZ), but unlike the continuum model, it offered the path to exact solution. In collaboration with David Gross, Migdal further developed this work in a widely cited paper from 1990. The exact solution of 2D quantum gravity through the double-scaling limit of matrix models, which reduces it to the Painlevé equation, was derived simultaneously by three independent groups: Gross and Migdal at Princeton University, Brézin and Kazakov at the École Normale Supérieure, and Douglas and Shenker at Rutgers University. Edward Witten and others later expanded and generalized the applicability of matrix models to topological field theories.

In the early 1990s, Migdal began studying the application of ideas from quantum field theory to the theory of turbulence, deriving in 1993 an exact loop equation for velocity circulation within a fluid. Working with Gregory Falkovich, Igor Kolokolov and Vladimir V. Lebedev, he developed a description of intermittency in nonlinear systems by means of instanton solutions of the stochastic differential equations.

Migdal returned to physics research in 2019, developing his earlier work on loop equations into a new approach for solving problems involving nonlinear physical flows. Initially, this work focused on the problem of decaying turbulence, in which a fluid flow evolves without external forcing. In a paper published in Fractal and Fractional in October 2023, Migdal reported an infinite-dimensional manifold of exact solutions of the Navier–Stokes loop equation for the Wilson loop in decaying turbulence, in dimensions greater than two. The Wilson loop in this context is a functional of closed contours in the fluid, built from the circulation of the velocity around the contour by analogy with the Wilson loop of gauge theory, and it obeys a linear equation in the space of loops. In the paper's later sections Migdal restricts the analysis to three-dimensional space, states that the solutions do not exist in fewer than three dimensions, and states that he has not shown that solutions of the Navier–Stokes equations with smooth initial data approach this stochastic solution.

Migdal described the solutions as equivalent to a fractal curve in a complex space, with random steps labelled by Ising-type variables and subject to number-theoretic constraints. He proposed that this gives a dual description of strongly turbulent flow as a random geometry in a different space, which he compared to the AdS/CFT correspondence of gauge theory. The comparison is an analogy drawn by the author, who also writes that the paper does not claim a full solution of the decaying turbulence problem. He named the discrete set of loop configurations underlying the solution the Euler ensemble, in honour of Leonhard Euler, and its statistics involve Euler's totient function.

In 2024, Migdal published a second paper, in Physics of Fluids, in which he reformulated the Euler ensemble as a Markov chain equivalent to a quantum statistical system of fermions on a ring and derived analytic expressions for the energy spectrum and energy decay of decaying turbulence. He reported that the predictions, including an asymptotic decay of the kinetic energy as t^{−5/4}, agreed with data from grid-turbulence experiments and direct numerical simulations within about 2 percent. Other researchers have examined the theory since. Elia Brué and Camillo De Lellis gave a rigorous mathematical treatment of parts of Migdal's momentum loop equation in a 2025 preprint, and in a 2026 paper Akash Rodhiya and Katepalli Sreenivasan compared the theory's predictions with long direct numerical simulations. They reported close agreement for simulations initialized with a Birkhoff–Saffman low-wavenumber spectrum, but a different energy decay exponent for Loitsianskii–Kolmogorov–Batchelor initial conditions, which they took to limit the universality claimed for the energy decay. The theory has also been extended by Migdal to magnetohydrodynamics.

On 19 December 2023, Migdal gave a lecture titled "Exact Solution of Decaying Turbulence" at the International Centre for Theoretical Sciences (ICTS-TIFR) in Bengaluru. The centre lists it among its Distinguished Lectures, as part of the programme "Field Theory and Turbulence", held from 18 to 22 December 2023. The lecture abstract summarizes the result published in Fractal and Fractional. He has also presented the work at the Institute for Advanced Study in Princeton. On 14 December 2022, while affiliated with New York University Abu Dhabi, he gave the Analysis and Mathematical Physics seminar of the School of Mathematics, titled "Classical Turbulence as Quantum Geometry". After joining the Institute as a member, he gave the same seminar series a second talk on 5 November 2024, "Duality of Fluid Mechanics and Solution of Decaying Turbulence", in which he described the duality between the Navier–Stokes equations and a one-dimensional momentum loop equation; the Institute's event page and video archive link to a recording, which is also available on YouTube. On 16 April 2025 he gave a talk titled "Duality of Decaying Turbulence to a Solvable String Theory" at the Physics Group Meeting of the School of Natural Sciences.

In more recent research, Migdal has applied loop calculus to the planar QCD loop equation. The first of two papers in Nuclear Physics B (April 2026) presents the solution with an area law, associated with quark confinement, in which the Wilson loop contains the exponential of the area of a Hodge-dual minimal surface, and the second (May 2026) treats the confining twistor string and the meson spectrum. Between 12 February and 26 March 2026 he gave a series of five lectures on the subject, "Loop Dynamics and a Geometric Solution of Planar QCD", in the School of Natural Sciences at the Institute for Advanced Study. According to the Institute's video archive, the lectures were "Loop Calculus and the Coordinate Space Dilemma" (12 February); "Momentum Loop Space and the Failure of Taylor–Magnus" (20 February); "Hodge Dual Minimal Surface and Quark Confinement" (26 February); "How to Place Majorana Fermions on this Rigid Surface to Cancel Non-planar Intersections via the Pauli Principle and Recover Asymptotically Free QCD" (12 March); and "Transitioning from Phase Space of Quark Loop to Twistor Space and Extracting the Exact Geometric Mass Spectrum via Twistor Monodromies and Catastrophe Theory" (26 March). The archive lists the first, third, fourth and fifth lectures under the Institute's "IAS Matrix Pizza Night" seminar and the second under its "IAS Informal Physics Seminar". The slides of all five lectures are available as a single PDF on the Institute's website, and recordings of the third and fourth lectures are also available on YouTube.

On 27 April 2026, Migdal gave the Physics Colloquium of the University of Luxembourg, titled "Decoding fluid chaos: The arithmetic attractor of decaying turbulence". In the abstract, Migdal describes an exact decaying solution in terms of a one-dimensional momentum loop whose support is organized by reduced rational numbers, with intermittency encoded in the Farey sequence, and states that recent numerical simulations support the view that the Euler ensemble describes a universal late-time state of decaying turbulence. The university's biography of the speaker describes the work as connecting classical turbulence, quantum mechanics and number theory. In a 2026 preprint, "Reduction of Decaying Navier–Stokes Turbulence to the Quantum Pendulum", Migdal writes the Euler ensemble as a quantum trace over fermions on a ring and reduces it to an integrable system, the quantum pendulum. The paper was available as a preprint at the time of writing.
