= Yuri Rumer =

Soviet theoretical physicist

Yuriy Rumer
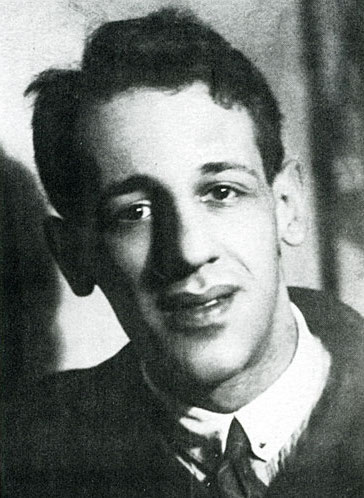
- Rumer c. 1920s
- Born: 28 April 1901; Moscow, Russian Empire
- Died: 1 February 1985 (aged 83); Novosibirsk, USSR
- Education: Moscow State University
- Awards: Order of the Badge of Honour
- Scientific career
- Fields: Theoretical physics
- Workplaces: MSU Faculty of Physics; Novosibirsk State University
- Doctoral students: Valery Pokrovsky

Yuri Borisovich Rumer (Russian: Юрий Борисович Румер, 28 April 1901 – 1 February 1985) was a Soviet theoretical physicist, who mostly worked in the fields of quantum mechanics and quantum optics. Known in the West as Georg Rumer, he was a close friend of Lev Landau, and was arrested with him during the Great Purge in 1938.

== Biography ==
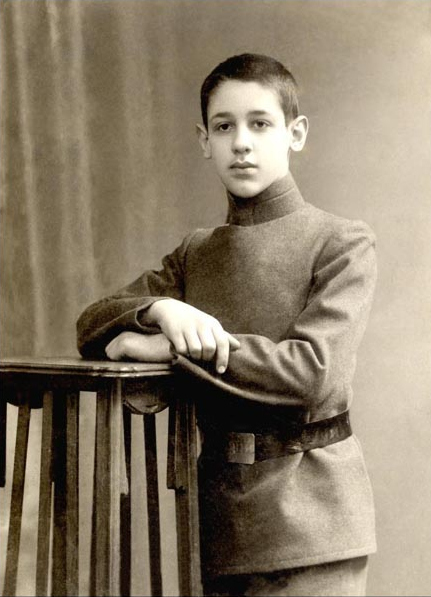
Rumer in 1915–17

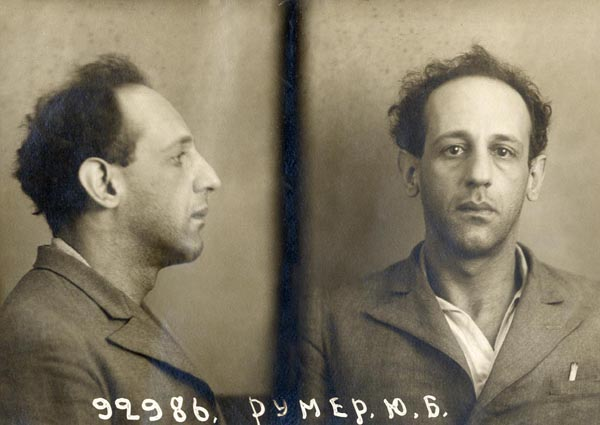
Mugshot of Rumer from 1938

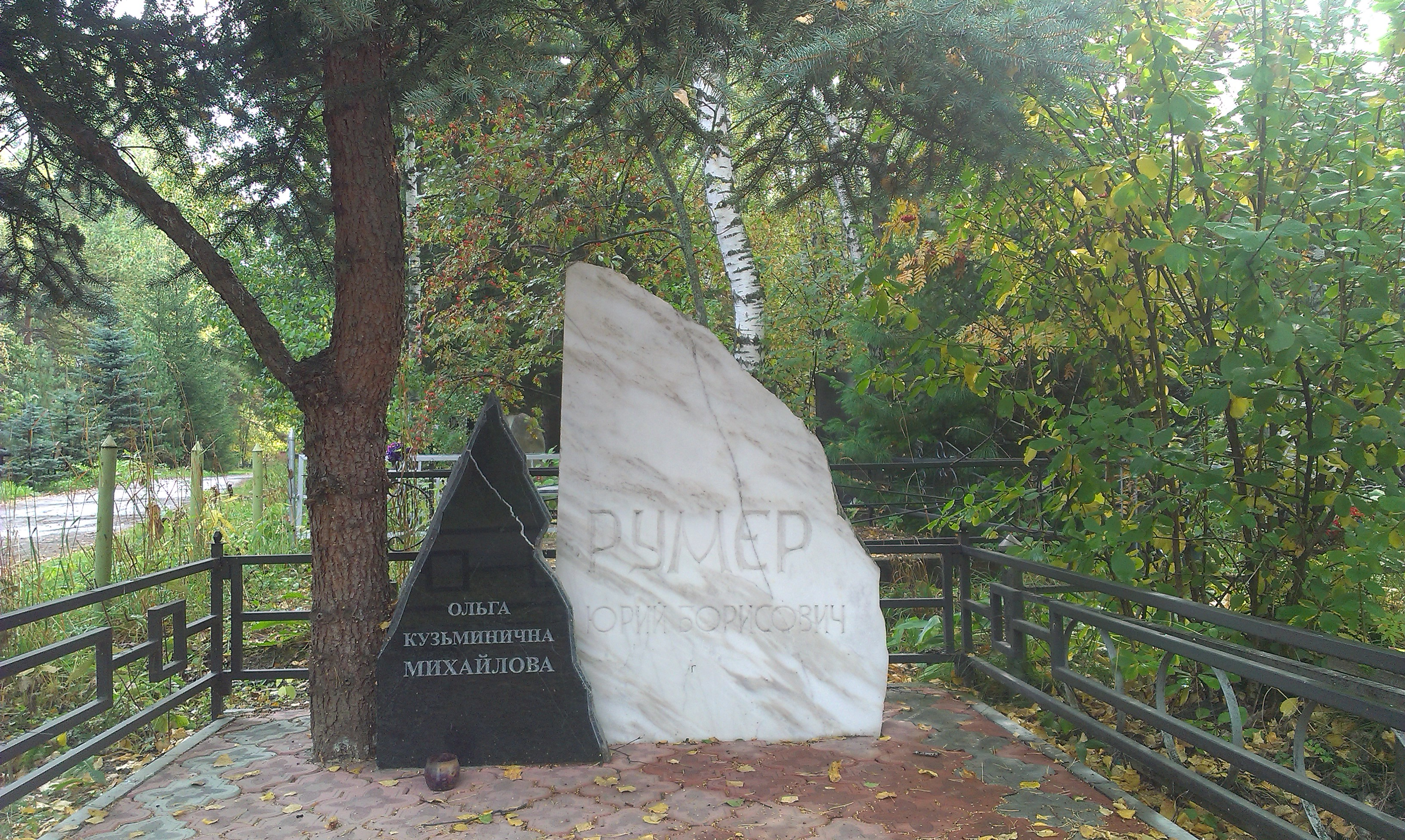
Grave of Rumer and his second wife at the Cherbuzinskoye cemetery in Novosibirsk

Rumer was born in Moscow into a Jewish merchant family. His elder brothers Osip and Isidor were well-known translators and philosophers. After graduating from non-classical secondary school in 1917, in 1918 Rumer entered the Physics and Mathematics Faculty of Moscow State University and graduated in 1924. In 1927 he married Lyudmila Zalkind, his girlfriend of nine years, and emigrated with her to Oldenburg, Germany, where he enrolled to study construction engineering. The same year he abandoned this boring for him topic in favor of theoretical physics, and moved to Göttingen. During an internship at the University of Göttingen he worked as an assistant of Max Born. He collaborated with Walter Heitler and published several theoretical works on the structure of molecules.

Rumer returned to Moscow in May 1932, as persecution of Jews in Germany became a real threat to him and his wife. He became an associate professor at the Faculty of Physics of Moscow State University (MSU) and assumed a professor position in January 1933. He was recommended for this position by Erwin Schrödinger and Leonid Mandelstam. At MSU Rumer supervised several notable scientists, including Mikhail Volkenshtein. He lectured at MSU from 1932 to 1937 and worked as a scientist at the Lebedev Physical Institute from 1935 to 1938. In 1935 he defended his habilitation, and in 1937 started working with Lev Landau; very soon they became close friends.

In 1938, the NKVD arrested Rumer on the basis of accusations that an acquaintance of his worked for the Gestapo and that he was aware of an anti-Soviet propaganda leaflet distribution effort. Rumer was arrested on the Arbat Street in April 1938 as an accomplice of the "public enemy", Landau, when he was going to a birthday party. One of his brothers was jailed earlier on an unrelated case as part of Stalin's purges. Landau was arrested too, but released after one year owing to the extraordinary efforts of Pyotr Kapitsa. While in jail Rumer first worked on plane flutter and wobble problems in a sharashka situated at an Omsk suburb. Later in 1946 he was transferred to Taganrog. There he worked on a project of a new transport aircraft, which was headed by Robert Bartini.

After serving full 10 years of his sentence, Rumer was exiled to Yeniseysk. There he worked at a teachers' training college as a professor of physics and mathematics. Rumer moved to Novosibirsk in 1950, where he made both ends meet owing to casual earnings for two years. He could not get a job at universities and research institutions because of his convict status. When his exile term ended, he was accepted for a senior staff scientist at the Siberian Division of the Academy of Sciences of the USSR. In the end of 1954 he was informed by the Military Board of the Supreme Court of the Soviet Union that his case was reconsidered and the sentence was waived due to the newly discovered evidence.

Rumer lectured at the Novosibirsk teachers' training institute, held a position of the head of the Theoretical Physics Department at the East-Siberian Branch of the Academy of Sciences of the USSR from 1953 to 1957. In 1957 he was appointed the director of the Radio Physics and Radio Electronics Institute which was the first physical institute in Novosibirsk. The institute was merged with the Semiconductor Physics Institute in 1964. Rumer worked at the Sobolev Institute of Mathematics for some time and later at the Budker Institute of Nuclear Physics. He carried out educational work at Novosibirsk State University for almost 20 years and retired in 1972. Rumer died on 1 February 1985 in Akademgorodok, he was buried at the Yuzhnoye Cemetery. The scientist was survived by his second wife Olga Mikhailova (1921–2011), son Mikhail Mikhailov and daughter Tatyana Mikhailova. Rumer and Mikhailova met in 1946 while working together in Taganrog, and married soon after that. Both of their children became scientists.

== Works ==
- G. Rumer, E. Teller and H. Weyl, Eine fur die Valenztheorie geeignete Basis der binaren Vektorinvarianten, Nachr. Ges. Wiss. Göttingen Math. -Phys. Kl. (1932), 499–504
- Dychne, A. M.; Rumer, J. B.; Bartels, F.; Frank, D. (1961). "Thermodynamik des ebenen Ising-Onsager-Dipolgitters". Fortschritte der Physik. 9 (10): 509. Bibcode:1961ForPh...9..509D. doi:10.1002/prop.19610091002.
- Quantenchemie mehratomiger Molekule. — Nachrichten von der Ges. der Wiss. Zu Göttingen. Math.-Phys. Klasse, 1930, № 3, pp. 277—284. (with Walter Heitler).
- Heitler, W.; Rumer, G. (1931). "Quantentheorie der chemischen Bindung für mehratomige Moleküle". Zeitschrift für Physik. 68 (1–2): 12–41. Bibcode:1931ZPhy...68...12H. doi:10.1007/BF01392726. S2CID 119987892.
- Eine fur die Valenztheorie geeignete Basis der binaren Vektorinvarianten. Nachrichten von der Ges. der Wiss. Zu Göttingen. Math.-Phys. Klasse, 1932, № 5, pp. 498—504. (with Edward Teller, Hermann Weyl).
