= Out-of-time-ordered correlator =

Mathematical definition in quantum chaos

In quantum mechanics, the out-of-time-ordered correlator (OTOC) serves as a mathematical tool for characterizing quantum chaos, information scrambling, and other aspects of many-body problems. In addition, it provides a quantum mechanical analog to the Lyapunov exponent, often used to characterize the sensitivity of variables to initial conditions in classical chaos. The OTOC thus provides a natural extension of classical chaos theory to the quantum realm, and can be calculated both numerically and experimentally.

OTOCs were first introduced by Anatoly Larkin and Y. N. Ovchinnikov in 1969 in the context of superconductivity.

== Definition ==
For two observable $V$ and $W$ in Heisenberg picture, the out-of-time-order correlator (OTOC) is typically defined in two different but physically closely related ways:

1. Based on commutator of $W(t)$ and $V(0)$:
  $$C(t)=\langle [W(t),V(0)]^{\dagger} [W(t),V(0)]\rangle$$
  direct calculation gives $C(t) = \langle V(0)^{\dagger} W(t)^{\dagger} W(t) V(0) \rangle + \langle W(t)^{\dagger} V(0)^{\dagger} V(0) W(t) \rangle - \langle V(0)^{\dagger} W(t)^{\dagger} V(0) W(t) \rangle - \langle W(t)^{\dagger} V(0)^{\dagger} W(t) V(0) \rangle .$
2. More directly
  $$F(t)=\langle W(t)^{\dagger} V(0)^{\dagger}W(t)V(0)\rangle$$
  Generally $C(t) = \langle V(0)^{\dagger} W(t)^{\dagger} W(t) V(0) \rangle + \langle W(t)^{\dagger} V(0)^{\dagger} V(0) W(t) \rangle - 2\,\mathrm{Re}\,F(t) .$ When $V$ and $W$ are unitaries, we have $C(t) = 2 \big( 1 - \mathrm{Re}\,F(t) \big) .$

where the expectation value $\langle \bullet \rangle =\operatorname{Tr} [\rho\, \bullet]$ is usually taken over some thermal state $\rho=\exp(-\beta H)/Z$ with $\beta=1/k_{\rm B}T$ ($k_{\mathrm B}$ is Boltzmann constant, $T$ is temperature) and $H$ is Hamiltonian, $Z=\operatorname{Tr} \exp(-\beta H)$ is canonical partition function.

Physically, the growth of this commutator measured by $C(t)$ tracks scrambling. And from chaos theory perspective, we have $C(t)\simeq e^{\lambda_{\mathrm L} t}$ where $\lambda_{\mathrm L}$ is the quantum Lyapunov exponent. This has a similar form as the classical dependence of initial pertuvation in classical chaos theory. Thus OTOC can be regarded as an indicator of quantum chaos.

== See also ==
- SYK model
