= Anatoly Larkin =

Russian physicist (1932–2005)

- Born: Anatoly Ivanovich Larkin; October 14, 1932; Kolomna, Soviet Union
- Died: August 4, 2005 (aged 72); Aspen, Colorado, U.S.
- Education: Moscow Institute for Physical Engineering
- Known for: Fulde–Ferrell–Larkin–Ovchinnikov phase Out-of-time-ordered correlator
- Scientific career
- Fields: Physics
- Workplaces: Kurchatov Institute of Atomic Energy in Moscow; L.D.Landau Institute for Theoretical Physics; University of Minnesota, Minneapolis
- Doctoral advisor: Arkady Migdal

Anatoly Ivanovich Larkin (Russian: Анатолий Иванович Ларкин; October 14, 1932 – August 4, 2005) was a Russian theoretical physicist.

== Life ==
Born in a small town of Kolomna in Moscow region, Larkin went on to receive his education at the Moscow Engineering Physics Institute. He worked on his PhD on the properties of plasmas under the supervision of A.B.Migdal and later received the degree of Doctor of Science (1965) for studies of superconductivity.

Research at the I.V. Kurchatov Institute in Moscow (1957–66) was followed by nearly 40 years of work at the Landau Institute for Theoretical Physics in Chernogolovka, Moscow region, where he moved in 1966. During 1970–1991, he was also a professor at Moscow State University. Since 1995, Larkin was a professor of physics at the University of Minnesota and a member of William I. Fine Theoretical Physics Institute.

The dominant part of his work is devoted to superconductivity, magnetism, ferro-electricity, properties of metals, semiconductors and dielectrics. He pioneered the concept of spontaneous symmetry breaking in the physics of elementary particles, discovered collective pinning of magnetic flux in superconductors, predicted paraconductivity and effects of fluctuations on properties of superconductors, made essential contributions to the theory of weak localization, as well as developed the concept of the Ehrenfest time and out-of-time-ordered correlators in quantum chaos.

A.I. Larkin was the teacher of a large number of actively working theorists. His students and collaborators are teaching and conducting research in Russia, USA, Great Britain, France, Italy, Germany, Switzerland, Israel and other countries.

He died suddenly at 6pm on August 4, 2005, in Aspen, Colorado, where he was attending a physics workshop.

== Honors and prizes ==
- Order of the Red Banner of Labour (1967)
- London Prize in Low Temperature Physics (1990)
- Member of Russian Academy of Sciences (1991), corresponding member of the USSR Academy of Sciences (1979)
- Hewlett Packard Europhysics Prize (1993)
- Alexander von Humboldt Medal (1993)
- Award of Excellence of the World Congress on Superconductivity (1994)
- Lars Onsager Prize (2002)
- John Bardeen Prize (2004)

== Selected publications ==
- A. Larkin, A. Varlamov, Theory of fluctuations in superconductors, Oxford University Press, 2005, xviii, 412 pp. ISBN 0-19-852815-9 [International Series of Monographs on Physics 127]
- V. M. Galitski, A. I. Larkin, Superconducting fluctuations at low temperature, Physical Review B 63 (17), 174506 (2001)
- I. L. Aleiner, A. I. Larkin, Role of divergence of classical trajectories in quantum chaos, Phys. Rev. E 55 (2), R1243-R1246 (1997)
- L. B. Ioffe and A. I. Larkin, Gapless fermions and gauge fields in dielectrics, Phys. Rev. B 39, 8988 (1989)
- A. L. Larkin, Yu.N. Ovchinnikov, Quantum tunneling with dissipation, JETP Lett., 37 (7), 382-385 (1983); Pis’ma v ZhETF, 37 (7), 322-325 (1983)
- S. Hikami, A.I. Larkin, Y. Nagaoka, Spin-Orbit Interaction and Magnetoresistance in the Two Dimensional Random System, Prog. Theor. Phys., 63(2), 707-710 (1980)
- A.I. Larkin, Effect of inhomogeneities on the structure of the mixed state of superconductors, Sov. Phys. JETP 31(4), 784 (1970); (RUS) ZhETF, 58 (4), 1466-1470 (1970)
- A.I. Larkin, D.E. Khmel’nitskii, Phase Transition in Uniaxial Ferroelectrics, Sov. Phys. JETP 29(6), 1123-1128 (1969); (RUS) ZhETF, 56 (6), 2087-2098 (1969)
- L.G. Aslamazov, A.I. Larkin, Effect of Fluctuations on the Properties of a Superconductor Above the Critical Temperature, Sov. Phys. Solid State, 10(4), 875-880 (1968); (RUS) Fizika Tverd. tela, 10 (4), 1104-1111 (1968)
- A.I. Larkin, Yu.N. Ovchinnikov, Nonuniform state of superconductors, Sov. Phys. JETP 20, 762 (1965); (RUS) ZhETF, 47(3), 1136-1146 (1964)
- V.G. Vaks, A.I. Larkin, On the application of the methods of superconductivity theory to the problem of the masses of elementary particles, Sov. Phys. JETP 13, 192-193 (1961); (RUS) ZhETF, 40(1), 282-285 (1961)
- A.A. Vedenov, A.I. Larkin, Equation of state of plasma, Sov. Phys. JETP 9, 806-821 (1959); (RUS) ZhETF, 36(4), 1133-1142 (1959)

== See also ==
- Nambu–Jona-Lasinio model
