= Kapper =

Kapper is a surname. Notable people with the surname include:

- Sirje Kapper (born 1992), Estonian football player and manager
- Siegfried Kapper (1821–1879), Bohemian-born Austrian writer
- Tiina Kapper (1895–1947), Estonian dancer and dance pedagogue

== See also ==
- Kaper
- Kappers
