= Landau Institute for Theoretical Physics =

Russian research institution

Coordinates: 55°42′32″N 37°34′34″E

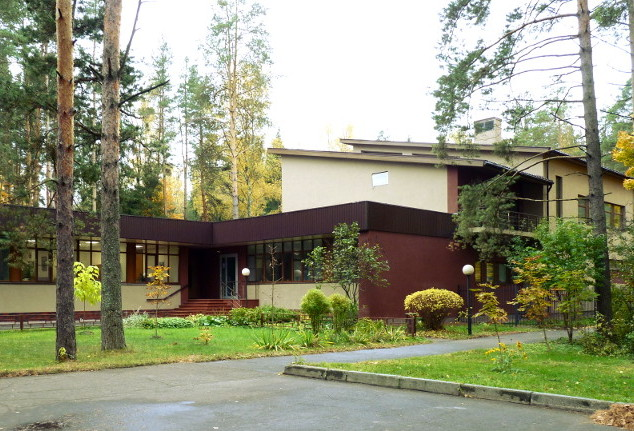
- Established: 1964
- Head: Igor Valentinovich Kolokolov
- Members: 62
- Address: Akademika Semenova av., 1A, 142432 Chernogolovka, Moscow region, Russia
- Location: Chernogolovka, Russia
- Website: http://www.itp.ac.ru/en/

The L. D. Landau Institute for Theoretical Physics (Russian: Институт теоретической физики имени Л. Д. Ландау (ИТФ)) of the Russian Academy of Sciences is a research institution, located in the small town of Chernogolovka near Moscow (there is also a subdivision in Moscow, on the territory of the P. L. Kapitza Institute for Physical Problems).

== History ==
The Landau Institute was formed in 1964 to keep the Landau school alive after the tragic car accident of Lev D. Landau. Since its foundation, the institute grew rapidly to about one hundred scientists, becoming one of the worldwide best-known and leading institutes for theoretical physics.

Unlike many other scientific centers in Russia, the Landau Institute had the strength to cope with the crisis of the nineties in the last century. Although about one half of the scientists accepted positions at leading scientific centers and universities abroad, most of them kept ties with their home institute, forming a scientific network in the tradition of the Landau school and supporting young theoretical physicists in the Landau Institute.

== Prominent members ==
Up to 1992, the institute was headed by Isaak Markovich Khalatnikov, who was then replaced by Vladimir E. Zakharov. Its numerous prominent scientists, mathematicians as well as physicists, include the Nobel laureate Alexei Alexeyevich Abrikosov as well as Igor Dzyaloshinsky, Lev Gor'kov, Vladimir Gribov, Arkady Migdal, Alexander Migdal, Anatoly Larkin, Sergei Novikov, Alexander Polyakov, Mark Azbel, Valery Pokrovsky, Emmanuel Rashba, Sergey Iordanskii, Ioshua Levinson, Alexei Starobinsky, Alexei Kitaev, Vadim Berezinskii (whose early death prevented him from sharing the Nobel Prize for the Berezinskii–Kosterlitz–Thouless transition theory), Serguei Brazovskii, Konstantin Efetov, David Khmel'nitsky, Vladimir Mineev, Grigory Volovik, Paul Wiegmann, Leonid Levitov, Alexander Finkel'stein, Alexander Zamolodchikov, Vadim Knizhnik, Konstantin Khanin, and Yakov G. Sinai.

== Fields of Research ==
The main fields of research are:

- Mathematical physics
- Computational physics
- Nonlinear dynamics
- Condensed matter theory
- Nuclear and elementary particle physics
- Quantum field theory

== See also ==
- Institute for Theoretical Physics (disambiguation)
- Center for Theoretical Physics (disambiguation)
