= Vladimir Mineev (physicist) =

Russian physicist

- Vladimir Petrovich Mineev
- Born: 9 October 1945 (age 80); Moscow
- Citizenship: Russian
- Education: the Moscow Institute of Physics and Technology
- Known for: physicist

Vladimir Petrovich Mineev (Владимир Петрович Минеев, surname sometimes transliterated as Mineyev; born 9 October 1945 in Moscow) is a Russian theoretical physicist, specializing in condensed matter physics.

== Biography ==
Mineev graduated in 1969 from the Moscow Institute of Physics and Technology and then became a graduate student at Moscow's Landau Institute for Theoretical Physics. There in 1974 he received his Russian Candidate of Sciences degree (Ph.D.) and in 1983 his Russian Doctor of Sciences degree (habilitation). At the Landau Institute of Theoretical Physics, he was a researcher from 1972 to 1991 and a vice-director from 1992 to 1999, as well as holding a chair in theoretical physics from 1991 to 1999. In 1993 and 1994 he organized Landau Institute summer schools. In Grenoble, France at the Institut Nanosciences et Cryogénie of the Commissariat à l'énergie atomique et aux énergies alternatives (CEA), he was in charge of the theory group, Service de physique statistique, magnétisme et supraconductivité (SPSMS), from 1999 to 2006 and is since 2006 a senior scientist. He is both a Russian and French citizen. He has served as a referee for the Proceedings of the National Academy of Sciences, Nature Physics, Physical Review Letters, and many other physics journals.

He has been a visiting scientist in 8 different countries. His visiting appointments at various locations include the Aspen Center for Physics in 1977 and again in 1989, France's IHES in 1978–1979, Finland's Low Temperature Laboratory of Aalto University at various times from 1979 to 1992, Denmark's Niels Bohr Institute in 1980 and again in 1998, Gothenburg's Chalmers University of Technology in 1981, ETH Zurich in 1991 and again in 2003 and 2008, Grenoble's Institut Laue-Langevin in 1993, Florida State University's National High Magnetic Field Laboratory in 1998–1999 and again in 2005, Kyōto's Yukawa Institute for Theoretical Physics in 1999 (as a guest professor), University of Oxford in 2003, both Tel Aviv University and the Weizmann Institute in 2004 and again in 2008, and the USA's Argonne National Laboratory in 2011.

In 1992 he received the Landau Gold Medal for the topological classification of stable defects in ordered media. In 2014 he was awarded the Lars Onsager Prize. His research deals with various problems in solid state physics, especially the theory of superconductivity and its interaction with magnetism.

He has been married since 1976 and has a son and two daughters.

== Selected publications ==
- Mineev, Vladimir P. (1998). Topologically Stable Defects and Solitons in Ordered Media.
- Mineev, Vladimir P., ed. (1995). The First Landau Institute Summer School, 1993: Selected Proceedings. Gordon and Breach. ISBN 9782884491389.
- Khalatnikov, Isaak M.; Mineev, Vladimir P., eds. (15 August 1996). 30 Years of the Landau Institute - Selected Papers. World Scientific. ISBN 9789814500463.
- Mineev, V. P.; Samokhin, Kirill V. (1999). Introduction to unconventional superconductivity. Gordon and Breach. ISBN 90-5699-209-0.
