= Melancthon Williams Jacobus Jr. =

United States theologian (1855–1937)

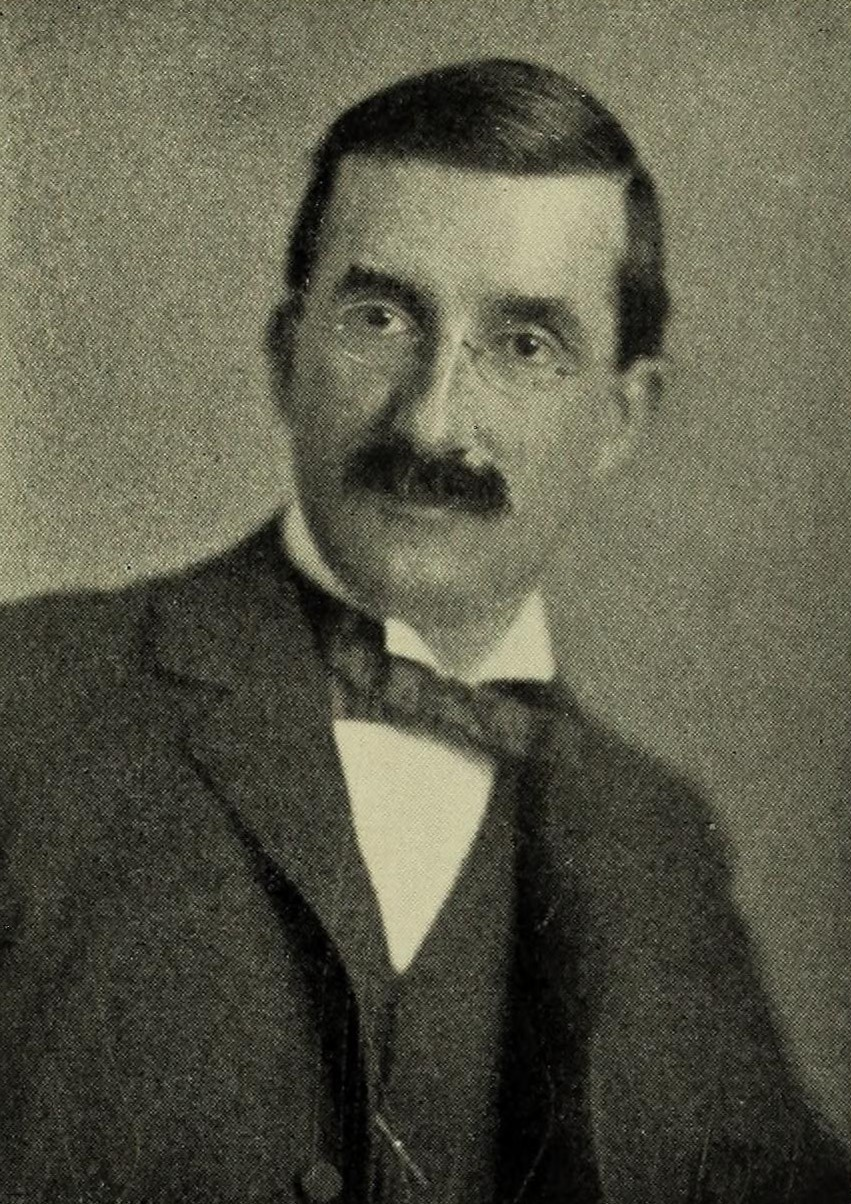
- Born: December 15, 1855; Allegheny City, Pennsylvania
- Died: 1937 (aged 81–82)
- Education: Princeton University (1877); Princeton Theological Seminary (1881); Lafayette College (1892); Yale University (1910)
- Father: Melancthon Williams Jacobus Sr.

Melancthon Williams Jacobus Jr. (1855–1937) was an American theologian.

== Biography ==
Jacobus was born December 15, 1855, in Allegheny City, Pennsylvania, the son of pastor Melancthon Williams Jacobus Sr. He graduated at Princeton University in 1877, at Princeton Theological Seminary in 1881, and studied in Europe at the universities of Göttingen and Berlin from 1881 to 1884. The degree of Doctor of Divinity (D.D.) was conferred on him by Lafayette College (1892) and by Yale University (1910). He held numerous positions in the field of religion, including pastor at Oxford, Pennsylvania (1884-1891). He served at Hartford Theological Seminary, Princeton Seminary, and Mount Holyoke College.

== Literary works ==
The contents of his Stone lectures at the Princeton Theological Seminary (1897–98) were published as A Problem in New Testament Criticism (1900). He was chairman of the editorial board of the Standard Bible Dictionary (1909), supervised an English translation of Zahn's New Testament Introduction (1909), and prepared a Commentary on the Gospel of Mark, for The Bible for Home and School Series (1914). He contributed theological articles to several encyclopedias, and was a contributing editor–in–charge of New Testament articles for the New International Encyclopedia.
