= Philip Holmes =

American mathematician

Philip J. Holmes
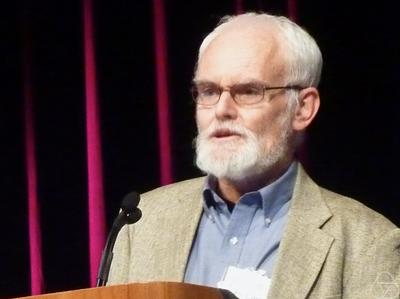
- Philip Holmes
- Born: May 24, 1945 (age 81)
- Education: University of Oxford; University of Southampton
- Scientific career
- Fields: Mechanical engineering, Applied mathematics
- Workplaces: Cornell University; Princeton University
- Doctoral students: Sue Ann Campbell; Jinqiao Duan; Robert Ghrist; Cristopher Moore; Emily Stone; Stephen Wiggins

Philip John Holmes (born May 24, 1945) is the Eugene Higgins Professor of Mechanical and Aerospace Engineering at Princeton University. As a member of the Mechanical and Aerospace Engineering department, he formerly served as the interim chair until May 2007.

Before moving to Princeton in 1994 he taught theoretical and applied mechanics at Cornell University from 1977 until 1994, when he was the Charles N. Mellowes Professor of Engineering and Professor of Mathematics.

Holmes was educated in England at the University of Oxford, where he studied engineering from 1964 to 1967, and at the University of Southampton, where he obtained a Ph.D. in engineering in 1974. He has made contributions to the field of nonlinear dynamics and differential equations, and has published books on subjects such as dynamical systems, turbulence, and celestial mechanics.

He was elected a fellow of the American Academy of Arts and Sciences in 1994. In 2001 he was elected an honorary member of the Hungarian Academy of Sciences. In 2006 he was elected a fellow of the American Physical Society, and in 2012 he was elected a fellow of the American Mathematical Society.

He also has published several collections of poetry. Among them his 1986 award-winning collection ‘The Green Road’.

In 2025, Holmes was elected to the National Academy of Engineering.

== Books ==
- Holmes, Philip J. (1980). New Approaches to Nonlinear Problems in Dynamics. Society for Industrial and Applied Mathematics. ISBN 9780898711677.
- Guckenheimer, John; Holmes, Philip (21 November 2013). Nonlinear Oscillations, Dynamical Systems, and Bifurcations of Vector Fields. Springer. ISBN 9781461211402; 1st edition 1983
- Diacu, Florin; Holmes, Philip (8 December 2020). Celestial Encounters: The Origins of Chaos and Stability. Princeton University Press. ISBN 9780691221830; 1st edition 1996
- Holmes, Philip; Lumley, John L.; Berkooz, Gahl; Rowley, Clarence W. (23 February 2012). Turbulence, Coherent Structures, Dynamical Systems and Symmetry. Cambridge University Press. ISBN 9781107008250; 1st edition 1996 (without Rowley)
  - Holmes, P.; Lumley, J. L.; Berkooz, G. (23 July 1998). Turbulence, Coherent Structures, Dynamical Systems and Symmetry. Cambridge University Press. ISBN 978-0-521-63419-9; 1st pbk edition
- Ghrist, Robert W.; Holmes, Philip J.; Sullivan, Michael C. (14 November 2006). Knots and Links in Three-Dimensional Flows. Springer. ISBN 9783540683476; 1st edition 1997
- Newton, Paul; Holmes, Philip; Weinstein, Alan, eds. (11 May 2006). Geometry, Mechanics, and Dynamics: Volume in Honor of the 60th Birthday of J. E. Marsden. Springer. ISBN 9780387217918.
