= Hans G. Kaper =

Dutch-American mathematician

Hans Gerard Kaper (born June 10, 1936) is a Dutch-American mathematician who worked for many years at Argonne National Laboratory until his retirement in 2008. He continues to hold adjunct professorships in mathematics and statistics at Georgetown University and in music at the University of Illinois at Urbana–Champaign, where he has been a long-term collaborator on the UIUC Computer Music Project.

Kaper was born in Alkmaar, Netherlands, and earned a PhD in 1965 from the University of Groningen under the supervision of Adriaan Isak van de Vooren. He taught briefly at Groningen before joining Argonne. At Argonne, he directed the Mathematics and Computer Science Division. He is also the editor-in-chief of SIAM News, the newsletter of the Society for Industrial and Applied Mathematics (SIAM). In 1989 he became correspondent of the Royal Netherlands Academy of Arts and Sciences.

Since retiring, Kaper has investigated the mathematics of climate change, and directs the NSF-funded Mathematics and Climate Research Network. With Hans Engler of Georgetown, he is a co-author of the book Mathematics and Climate (SIAM, 2013), which won the 2013 ASLI Choice Award of the Atmospheric Science Librarians International.

In 2009, Kaper and his son Tasso J. Kaper (a mathematician at Boston University) were simultaneously honored as fellows of SIAM.
