= Konstantin Khanin =

Russian mathematician and physicist

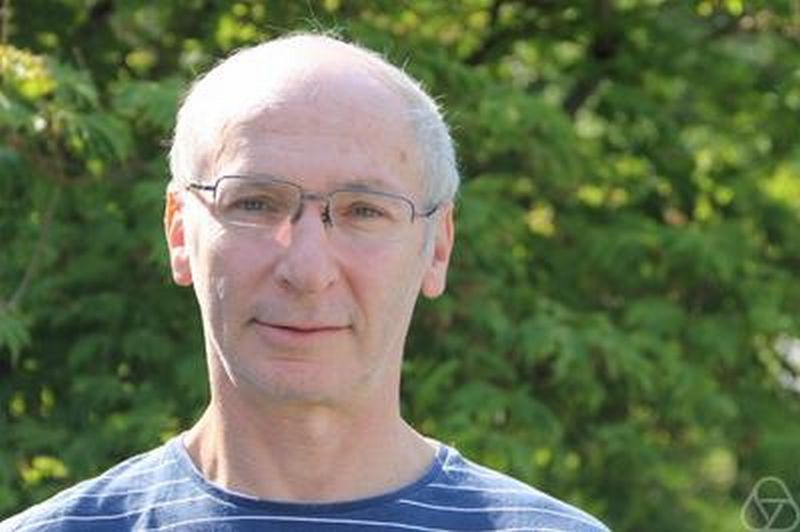
- Khanin in 2014 at the Mathematical Research Institute of Oberwolfach
- Education: Landau Institute of Theoretical Physics
- Awards: Simons Fellow (2013); Jean-Morlet Chair, CIRM (2017); Invited Speaker, ICM 2018; Humboldt Prize (2021)
- Scientific career
- Fields: Mathematics; Statistical mechanics Ergodic theory
- Workplaces: Landau Institute of Theoretical Physics; Princeton University; Isaac Newton Institute; Heriot-Watt University; University of Toronto
- Doctoral advisor: Yakov G. Sinai

Konstantin "Kostya" Mikhailovich Khanin (Russian: Константин Михайлович Ханин) is a Russian mathematician and physicist. He served as the chair of the Department of Mathematical and Computational Sciences at the University of Toronto Mississauga.

== Background ==
Khanin received his PhD from the Landau Institute of Theoretical Physics in Moscow and continued working there as a Research Associate until 1994. Afterwards, he taught at Princeton University, at the Isaac Newton Institute in Cambridge, and at Heriot-Watt University before joining the faculty at the University of Toronto. Khanin was an invited speaker at the European Congress of Mathematics in Barcelona in 2000. He was a 2013 Simons Foundation Fellow. He held the Jean-Morlet Chair at the Centre International de Rencontres Mathématiques in 2017, and he was an Invited Speaker at the International Congress of Mathematicians in 2018 in Rio de Janeiro. In 2021 he was awarded The Humboldt Prize, also known as the Humboldt Research Award, in recognition of his lifetime's research achievements.
