= Tasso J. Kaper =

American mathematician

Tasso Joost Kaper Ph.D.
- Education: University of Chicago (B.Sc.) California Institute of Technology (Ph.D.)
- Occupations: Mathematician, Professor
- Website: https://math.bu.edu/people/tasso/

Tasso Joost Kaper (born June 25, 1964) is an American mathematician at Boston University, where he chairs the Department of Mathematics and Statistics. His research concerns dynamical systems and applied mathematics.

Kaper's father is Hans G. Kaper, a Dutch-born retired mathematician at Argonne National Laboratory. Tasso Kaper did his undergraduate studies at the University of Chicago, graduating in 1986. He earned a Ph.D. in 1992 from the California Institute of Technology, under the supervision of Stephen Wiggins. On finishing his doctorate, he joined the faculty at Boston University, where he has remained. He was editor-in-chief of SIAM Journal on Applied Dynamical Systems from 2005 to 2011, when he became department chair. He is currently an editor-in-chief of the journal Nonlinearity for the Institute of Physics.

In 2009, both Tasso and Hans Kaper were simultaneously honored as fellows of the Society for Industrial and Applied Mathematics. In 2012, Kaper became one of the inaugural fellows of the American Mathematical Society.
