= Rudolf Nieuwenhuys =

Dutch neuroanatomist (1927–2024)

- Born: Rudolf Nieuwenhuys; 11 June 1927; Amsterdam, Netherlands
- Died: 4 November 2024 (aged 97); Abcoude, Netherlands
- Education: University of Amsterdam
- Occupation: Neuroanatomist

Rudolf Nieuwenhuys (11 June 1927 – 4 November 2024) was a Dutch neuroanatomist who was Emeritus Professor of Neuroanatomy and Comparative Neuroanatomy at the Catholic University in Nijmegen. He is recognised for his contribution to the field of comparative neuroanatomy. Professor Nieuwenhuys graduated from the Faculty of Medicine of the University of Amsterdam in 1955 and in 1960 obtained a PhD at the same institute with the dissertation Het Telencephalon der Actinopterygii. He started his research in the field of neuroanatomy in The Netherlands Institute for Neuroscience, Amsterdam, the Netherlands. He was the author of important works in neuroanatomy including The Central Nervous System of Vertebrates, The Human Central Nervous System and Towards a New Neuromorphology.

In 1998, Nieuwenhuys was awarded the Academy Medal of the Royal Netherlands Academy of Arts and Sciences (KNAW).

Nieuwenhuys was born in Amsterdam on 11 June 1927, and died in Abcoude on 4 November 2024, at the age of 97.

== Publications ==
- Nieuwenhuys, Rudolf (1985) Chemoarchitecture of the Brain. Springer, Heidelberg. DOI:10.1007/978-3-642-70426-0
- Nieuwenhuys, Rudolf; ten Donkelaar, Hans J.; Nicholson, Charles (1998). The Central Nervous System of Vertebrates. Springer, Berlin. DOI: 10.1007/978-3-642-18262-4
- Nieuwenhuys, Rudolf; Voogd, Jan; van Huijzen, Chris (2008) The Human Central Nervous System. 4th edition. Springer, Berlin. DOI: 10.1007/978-3-540-34686-9
- Nieuwenhuys, Rudolf; Puelles, Luis (2016) Towards a New Neuromorphology. Springer, Cham. DOI: 10.1007/978-3-319-25693-1

== Sources ==
- Nicholson, Charles; Smeets, Wil J.A.J. (1992). "Rudolf Nieuwenhuys: Twenty-Five Years of Comparative Neuroanatomy in Nijmegen". Brain, Behavior and Evolution. 39 (6): 381–387. doi:10.1159/000114133. PMID 1498658.
- Desfilis, Ester; Medina, Loreta. (2016) Rudolf Nieuwenhuys "Science is tremendously susceptible to fashion" [interview]. Mètode 2016 - 89. Online only. The secrets of the brain - Spring 2016. https://metode.org/issues/monographs/en-rudolf-nieuwenhuys.html
- https://www.worldcat.org/wcidentities/lccn-n78042676
