= Stephen Wiggins =

American mathematician

Stephen R. Wiggins
- Born: 1959 (age 66–67); Oklahoma City, Oklahoma, US
- Education: Pittsburg State University - BSc; University of Wisconsin - MA, MSc; Cornell University - PhD
- Known for: Fluid dynamics, nonlinear dynamics and chaos in classical mechanics and mechanics applied to atomic systems
- Scientific career
- Fields: Physics, Chemistry, Applied Mathematics
- Workplaces: University of Bristol; California Institute of Technology; Hetao Institute of Mathematics and Interdisciplinary Sciences
- Doctoral advisor: Philip Holmes
- Doctoral students: Tasso J. Kaper, Igor Mezić

Stephen Ray Wiggins (born 1959) is a Cherokee-American prolific applied mathematician in the fields of nonlinear dynamics, chaos theory and nonlinear phenomena. His wide range of outstanding contributions include Lagrangian aspects of fluid dynamics and reaction dynamics in theoretical chemistry. He is currently a full professor at the Hetao Institute of Mathematics and Interdisciplinary Sciences, China and honorary professor in Bristol University.

== Early life and education ==
Wiggins was born in Oklahoma City, Oklahoma in 1959, and has two younger siblings. He is enrolled as a citizen of the Cherokee Nation. He received a BSc in physics and mathematics from Pittsburg State University in 1980, an MA in mathematics and an MSc in physics from the University of Wisconsin-Madison in 1983, and a PhD in theoretical and applied mechanics from Cornell University in 1985. He also attended the Open University in Great Britain, where he earned a Bachelor of Laws, with honors, in 2005.

== Academic career and field of study ==
Wiggins was influenced heavily by his PhD advisor Philip Holmes. His dissertation was on "Slowly Varying Oscillators." From 1987 to 2001, he was a professor at Caltech. He is an emeritus professor of applied mathematics in University of Bristol, where he was the head of the mathematics department from 2004 until 2008 and was the school research director. As of August 2020 Wiggins had 12 PhD students and 60 academic descendants. In 2026, he took a faculty role in Hetao Institute of Mathematics and Interdisciplinary Sciences, initiated by Shing-Tung Yau, as a professor and retaining his emeritus role in Bristol.

Wiggins has contributed in many different areas of applied mathematics, science, and engineering using applied and computational dynamics as the framework for his approach and analysis.

His current focus is on developing the phase space approach to chemical reaction dynamics in the setting of the CHAMPS (Chemistry and Mathematics in Phase Space) project. Previously he has established a successful US-UK-Spain research network in building a foundational connection between applied mathematics and theoretical chemistry with Turgay Uzer.

== Honors ==
Wiggins received the Presidential Young Investigators Award from the National Science Foundation (NSF) in August 1989.

He was a Stanislaw M. Ulam Visiting Scholar at the Center for Nonlinear Studies, Los Alamos National Laboratory, from 1989 to 1990.

He received the US Office of Naval Research (ONR) Young Investigator Award in Applied Analysis in 1989.

== Selected publications ==
- Uzer, Turgay; Jaffé, C.; Palacián, J.; Yanguas Palacián, P.; Wiggins, Stephen, 2002 Nonlinearity 15 957 (Quite influential in chemical reactions).
- V.J.García-Garrido; M.Katsanikas; M.Agaoglou; S.Wiggins: Tuning the branching ratio in a symmetric potential energy surface with a post-transition state bifurcation using external time dependence, Chemical Physics Letters, 2020-09: DOI: 10.1016/j.cplett.2020.137714
- Fang Yang; Yayun Zheng; Jinqiao Duan; Ling Fu; Stephen Wiggins: The tipping times in an Arctic sea ice system under influence of extreme events, Chaos: An Interdisciplinary Journal of Nonlinear Science, 2020-06: DOI: 10.1063/5.0006626

== Books ==
- Global Bifurcations and Chaos -- Analytical Methods. Springer-Verlag Applied Mathematical Science Series. 1988, second printing 1990. ISBN 0387967753
- Introduction to Applied Nonlinear Dynamical Systems and Chaos. Springer-Verlag textbooks in Applied Mathematics Series, 1990, second printing 1991. Second Edition (expanded) 2003. First edition translated into Japanese. ISBN 0387001778
- Chaotic Transport in Dynamical Systems. Springer-Verlag Interdisciplinary Applied Mathematical Sciences Series, 1992. ISBN 0387975225
- Global Dynamics, Phase Space Transport, Orbits Homoclinic to Resonances, and Applications. American Mathematical Society, 1993. ISBN 0821892029
- Normally Hyperbolic Invariant Manifolds in Dynamical Systems. Springer-Verlag Applied Mathematical Science Series, 1994. ISBN 038794205X
- Invariant Manifolds and Fibrations for Perturbed Nonlinear Schrödinger Equations (with Y. Li). Springer-Verlag Applied Mathematical Science Series, 1997. ISBN 0387949259
- Lagrangian Transport in Geophysical Jets and Waves: The Dynamical Systems Approach (with R. Samelson). Springer-Verlag Interdisciplinary Applied Mathematical Sciences Series, 2006. Translated into Russian, 2010. ISBN 0387332693
- Mathematical Foundations of Mixing: The Linked Twist Map as a Paradigm in Applications Micro to Macro, Fluids to Solids (with R. Sturman and J. M. Ottino). Cambridge University Press, 2006. ISBN 0521868130

== Open books ==
- Elementary Classical Mechanics. figshare. (2017)
- Ordinary Differential Equations. figshare. (2017)
- Solutions to the Exercises in Elementary Classical Mechanics. Figshare. (2018)
- Lagrangian Descriptors: Discovery and Quantification of Phase Space Structure and Transport
- Chemical Reactions: A Journey into Phase Space
- Wiggins, Stephen (2020): Elementary Quantum Mechanics. figshare. Book
- Wiggins, Stephen (2020): Solutions to the Exercises in Elementary Quantum Mechanics. figshare. Book
