= Melancthon Williams Jacobus Sr. =

Personal life
- Born: September 19, 1816 Newark, New Jersey
- Died: October 28, 1876 (aged 60)
- Education: Princeton University (1834); Princeton Theological Seminary (1838); Jefferson College (1952)

Religious life
- Religion: Presbyterianism
- Church: First Presbyterian Church of Brooklyn, New York (1839–1850); Central Presbyterian Church of Pittsburgh, Pennsylvania (1858–1970)

Melancthon Williams Jacobus Sr. (September 19, 1816 – October 28, 1876) was an American Presbyterian minister and writer.

== Biography ==
Jacobus was born September 19, 1816, in Newark, New Jersey. He graduated from Princeton College in 1834 and Princeton Seminary in 1838. He received the degree of D.D. from Jefferson College (now Washington & Jefferson College) in 1852 and LL. D. from Princeton in 1867.

In 1839, after a year of teaching Hebrew at Princeton Seminary, Jacobus accepted the pastorate of the First Presbyterian Church in Brooklyn, New York. After serving nearly twelve years, his health failed, and he made a tour through Europe, Egypt, and the Holy Land. On his return to the United States, he became a professor of Oriental and biblical literature at Western Theological Seminary, Allegheny, Pennsylvania, and he held that chair from 1852 until his death in 1876. Between 1858 and 1870, in addition to his academic duties, he served as pastor of the Central Presbyterian Church of Pittsburgh, Pennsylvania.

In 1869 Jacobus was the moderator of the last general assembly of the old school branch of the U.S. Presbyterians, and in 1870 presided, conjointly with Philemon H. Fowler, at the opening of the first assembly of the reunited church.

== Writing ==
Jacobus' personal diary contains this sad, yet illuminating note: "Sept 19, 1876. This day—a brilliant sky and invigorating air—I am sixty years old, writing these reminiscences of early life, thankful to a covenant God for His great goodness, wherewith He has distinguished my lot, and hopeful for other years of usefulness." This was written a mere 5 weeks before his death.

Jacobus would go on to produce several commentaries upon Scripture that found favor within many in the Reformed community. Charles Hodge, William Henry Green, J. W. Alexander and others from Princeton Seminary said, "The excellent Commentaries of Dr. Melancthon Jacobus have deservedly attained a high reputation, and their wide circulation proves how well they are adapted to the wants of both ministers and laymen. They present, in a brief compass, the results of extensive erudition, abound in judicious exposition and pertinent illustration, and are, moreover, distinguished by doctrinal soundness, evangelical character, and an eminently devout spirit."

Others have given equal praise to Jacobus' written works. C. H. Spurgeon stated his commentary on Genesis is "A very valuable work...It contains much Gospel teaching, and aids the preacher greatly. Not easily to be obtained. It ought to be reprinted." William S. Plumer noted that Jacobus' commentaries were "characterized by solid learning, sound doctrine, and lucid statements, a pleasant style, and the most serious spirit of piety." Regarding his work on Acts, Dr. Robert P. Martin showered praise with this comment: "Jacobus writes in the popular style of Albert Barnes, and is solidly Reformed. Some commentators make you plow an acre to find a single nugget; but not Jacobus. His exegetical notes are concise but meaty, with rich veins of practical exposition."

=== Publications ===
- Notes on the New Testament (four volumes, 1848–1859)
- Address to the Churches (1861)
- Note: Critical and Explanatory on Genesis (two volumes, 1864–1865)
- Exodus (1876)
- Notes: Critical and Explanatory on the Acts of the Apostles (1859)
- Letters on the Public School Question

== Family ==
His son Melancthon Williams Jacobus Jr. was a clergyman and educator.
