= Seweryn Chomet =

Seweryn Chomet (6 May 1930 in Drohobycz, Ukraine – 24 July 2009 in London, England) was a physicist, author, journalist, historian, publisher, prolific translator of Russian scientific journals into English, and former visiting research fellow of King's College London.

Chomet grew up in Nazi-occupied Ukraine and arrived in London as a stateless refugee. Chomet was a successively a graduate, demonstrator (1956), and lecturer (1963) in the Physics Department of King's College London. He retired in 1987, returning part-time as a visiting lecturer.

Apart from his career in physics he was also a journalist, an author, and a translator of scientific works to and from Russian. In retirement, a chance enquiry into Prince Albert’s correspondence with Charles Wheatstone led him into another career, as an archival researcher and biographer of Victorian royalty. He died on 24 July 2009.

== Books ==
=== As author or co-author ===
- D.N.A. Genesis of a Discovery (Ed.), Newman-Hemisphere Press 1994, London
- Count de Mauny – Friend of Royalty, Newman-Hemisphere Press, London
- Helena: A Princess Reclaimed, Begell House, New York, 1999 ISBN 1-56700-145-9
- Outrage at Auschwitz, Newman-Hemisphere Press, London 1990 ISBN 1-873106-00-9 / 1873106009ISBN 978-1-873106-00-6 / 9781873106006
- Applications of Group Theory in Quantum Mechanics by Mariia Ivanovna Petrashen, Eugenii Dmitreivich Trifonov, Seweryn Chomet, J. L. Martin. Hardcover, I P C Science & Technology Press, Limited, ISBN 0-592-05078-5
- Industrial Relations Bill: A Basis for Agreement? by Seweryn Chomet. Softcover, Newman Communications Ltd, ISBN 0-903012-00-6
- Nuclear Physics by Konstantin Nikiforovich Mukhin, D. A. Smith, Seweryn Chomet. Hardcover, MacDonald & Company (Publishers), Limited, ISBN 0-356-03415-1
- Solid State Electronics by Gérard Fournet, Seweryn Chomet. Hardcover, I P C Science & Technology Press, Limited, ISBN 0-592-02836-4
- Theory of Luminescence by Boris Ivanovich Stepanov, Viktor Pavlovich Gribkovskii, Seweryn Chomet. Hardcover, I P C Science & Technology Press, Limited, ISBN 0-592-05046-7
