= C. U. Ariëns Kappers =

Dutch neurologist and anatomist

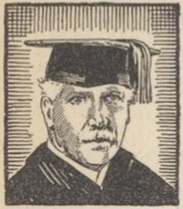
C.U. Ariëns Kappers

Cornelius Ubbo Ariëns Kappers (9 August 1877 – 28 July 1946) was a Dutch neurologist and anatomist.

== Life ==
As a student, Ariëns Kappers was influenced by the work of the German neurologist Ludwig Edinger (1855–1918) and Dutch anatomist Louis Bolk (1866–1930). During his career, he amassed around 450 whole brains from over 300 species and over 30,000 brain slices.

In 1909, Ariëns Kappers became the first director of the Netherlands Central Institute for Brain Research (Nederlands Instituut voor Hersenonderzoek), a position he maintained until his death in 1946. During his tenure, the institute became a center internationally renowned for its work in comparative neuroanatomy.

In 1922 he became member of the Royal Netherlands Academy of Arts and Sciences.

In the Second World War he used his expertise in Phrenology as proof that certain persons couldn't be Jewish, thereby saving them from German persecution and death. He was honored by Yad Vashem in 2017 as a Righteous of Nations.

== Family ==
In 1937 he married Mme B. Lehmann von Hunteln.

== Scientific Recognition ==
Two scientific awards are named in his honour:

- the Ariëns Kappers Medal for landmark contributions to neuroscience, awarded by the Royal Netherlands Academy of Arts and Sciences;
- the C. U. Ariëns Kappers Prize for the best neurology-related publication by a PhD student, awarded by the Dutch Neurological Society (Nederlandse Vereniging voor Neurologie).

== Selected written works ==
- 1904 De banen en centra in de hersenen der teleostiers en selachiers
- 1907 Untersuchungen über das Gehirn der Ganoiden Amia calva und Lepidosteus osseus
- 1910 "The migrations of the motor cells of the bulbar trigeminus, abducens and facialis in the series of vertebrates, and the differences in the course of their root-fibres"
- 1921 Die vergleichende Anatomie des Nervensystems der Wirbeltiere und des Menschen (published in English in 1936 as "The comparative anatomy of the nervous system of vertebrates, including man" and in French in 1947 as Anatomie comparee du systeme nerveux, particulierement de celui des mammiferes et de l'homme).
- 1922 Zielsinzicht en levensopbouw
- 1928 "Three lectures on neurobiotaxis and other subjects delivered at the University of Copenhagen"
- (1928?) Vergleichende Anatomie des Nervensystems
- 1929 "The evolution of the nervous system in invertebrates, vertebrates and man"
- 1931 "The anthropology of the Near East"
- 1934 "An introduction to the anthropology of the Near East in ancient and recent times"
- (1934?) Reiziger in breinen: herinneringen van een hersenonderzoeker
- 1934 Nervensystem
