= Isaak Khalatnikov =

Russian physicist (1919–2021)

- Исаак Халатников; Ісаак Халатников
- Born: Yekaterinoslav, Ukrainian SSR, Soviet Union
- Died: Chernogolovka, Russia
- Known for: BKL singularity Fermi liquid theory Quantum triviality
- Awards: ForMemRS (1992); Landau Gold Medal (1974); Stalin Prize (1952)
- Scientific career
- Fields: physics

Isaak Markovich Khalatnikov ForMemRS (Ukrainian: Ісаак Маркович Халатников, romanized: Isaak Markovych Khalatnykov, Russian: Исаак Маркович Халатников; 17 October 1919 – 9 January 2021) was a Soviet theoretical physicist who made significant contributions to many areas of theoretical physics, including general relativity, quantum field theory, and the theory of quantum liquids. He is well known for his role in developing the Landau-Khalatnikov theory of superfluidity and the so-called BKL conjecture in the general theory of relativity.

== Life and career ==
Isaak Khalatnikov was born into a Ukrainian Jewish family in Yekaterinoslav (now Dnipro, Ukraine) and graduated from Dnipropetrovsk State University with a degree in Physics in 1941. He had been a member of the Communist Party since 1944. He earned his doctorate in 1952. His wife Valentina was the daughter of Revolutionary hero Mykola Shchors.

Much of Khalatnikov's research was a collaboration with, or inspired by, Lev Landau, including the Landau-Khalatnikov theory of superfluidity.

During 1969 he briefly worked as a part-time professor of theoretical physics at Leiden University.

In 1970, inspired by the mixmaster model introduced by Charles W. Misner, then at Princeton University, Khalatnikov, together with Vladimir Belinski and Evgeny Lifshitz, introduced what has become known as the BKL conjecture, which is widely regarded as one of the most outstanding open problems in the classical theory of gravitation.

Khalatnikov directed the Landau Institute for Theoretical Physics in Moscow from 1965 to 1992. He was elected to the Academy of Sciences of the Soviet Union in 1984. He has been awarded the Landau Gold Medal, the Humboldt Prize, and the Marcel Grossmann Award. He was also a foreign member of the Royal Society of London.

He was portrayed by actor Georg Nikoloff in the film The Theory of Everything.

Khalatnikov died in Chernogolovka on 9 January 2021, aged 101.

== Honours and awards ==
- Order "For Merit to the Fatherland", 3rd class (1999)
- Order of Alexander Nevsky (2020)
- Order of the October Revolution (1986)
- Order of the Patriotic War, 2nd class (1985)
- Three Orders of the Red Banner of Labour (1954, 1956, 1975)
- Order of Friendship of Peoples (1979)
- Order of the Badge of Honour (1950)
- Stalin Prize, 2nd class (1953)
- Marcel Grossmann Award (2012) "For the discovery of a general solution of the Einstein equations with a cosmological singularity of an oscillatory chaotic character known as the BKL singularity"
- Asteroid 468725 Khalat was named in his honor. The official naming citation was published by the Minor Planet Center on 18 May 2019 (M.P.C. 114955).

== Partial bibliography ==
=== Books ===
- Khalatnikov, I. M. (2018). An Introduction to the Theory of Superfluidity. CRC Press. ISBN 978-0-42-997144-0.
- Khalatnikov, I. M. (2012). From the Atomic Bomb to the Landau Institute. Springer Berlin Heidelberg. ISBN 978-3-64-227561-6.

=== Selected academic works ===
- Landau, L.D.; Abrikosov, A.A.; Khalatnikov, I.M. (1954). "On the removal of infinities in quantum electrodynamics". Dokl. Akad. Nauk SSSR. 95: 497–500.
- Landau, L.D.; Abrikosov, A.A.; Khalatnikov, I.M. (1954). "An asymptotic expression for the photon Green function in quantum electrodynamics". Dokl. Akad. Nauk SSSR: 1177.
- Landau, L.D.; Khalatnikov, I.M. (1954). "On the anomalous absorption of sound near a second order phase transition point". Dokl. Akad. Nauk SSSR. 96 (469).
- Landau, L.D.; Khalatnikov, I.M. (1956). "The gauge transformation of the Green's function for charged particles". Soviet Phys. JETP. 2. OSTI 4367653.
- Abrikosov, A.A.; Khalatnikov, I.M. (1959). "The theory of a Fermi liquid (the properties of liquid 3He at low temperatures)". Reports on Progress in Physics. 22 (329): 329–367. Bibcode:1959RPPh...22..329A. doi:10.1088/0034-4885/22/1/310. S2CID 250822964.
- Bekarevich, I.L.; Khalatnikov, I.M. (1961). "Phenomenological derivation of the equations of vortex motion in He II" (PDF). Soviet Phys. JETP. 13 (3). Archived from the original (PDF) on 23 January 2021.
- Lifshitz, E.M.; Khalatnikov, I.M. (1963). "Investigations in relativistic cosmology". Adv. Phys. 12 (46): 185–249. doi:10.1080/00018736300101283.
- Belinskii, V.A.; Khalatnikov, I.M.; Lifshitz, E.M. (1970). "Oscillatory approach to a singular point in the relativistic cosmology". Adv. Phys. 19 (80): 525–573. Bibcode:1970AdPhy..19..525B. doi:10.1080/00018737000101171.
- Belinskii, V.A.; Khalatnikov, I.M.; Lifshitz, E.M. (1982). "A general solution of the Einstein equations with a time singularity". Adv. Phys. 31 (3): 639–667. Bibcode:1982AdPhy..31..639B. doi:10.1080/00018738200101428.
- Khalatnikov, I.M.; Lifshitz, E.M.; Khanin, K.M.; Shchur, L.N.; Sinai, Y.G. (1985). "On the stochasticity in relativistic cosmology". Journal of Statistical Physics. 38 (2): 97–114. Bibcode:1985JSP....38...97K. doi:10.1007/BF01017851. S2CID 120521834.

== See also ==
- Fermi liquid theory
- Landau pole
- Quantum triviality
