= Jacobus Kaper =

Jacobus Martinus Kaper (born 12 September 1931) is a biochemist and virologist who worked at the Henry A. Wallace Beltsville Agricultural Research Center of the Agricultural Research Service of the United States. He has performed research on the cucumber mosaic virus.

Kaper was born in Madjalengka, Dutch East Indies. He was elected corresponding member of the Royal Netherlands Academy of Arts and Sciences in 1980.
