= List of things named after Lev Landau =

Lev Landau (1908 – 1968), Soviet physicist who made fundamental contributions to many areas of theoretical physics, is the eponym of the topics in physics listed below.

== Physics ==
- Darrieus–Landau instability
- Derjaguin–Landau–Verwey–Overbeek theory
- Ivanenko–Landau–Kähler equation
- Ginzburg–Landau theory
- Guderley–Landau–Stanyukovich problem
- Landau damping
- Landau derivative
- Landau diamagnetism
- Landau distribution
- Landau's Fermi-liquid theory
- Landau gauge
- Landau kinetic equation
- Landau's phase transition theory
- Landau pole
- Landau potential
- Landau principle
- Landau quantization or Landau levels
- Landau–Hopf theory of turbulence
- Landau–Levich problem
- Landau–Lifshitz model
- Landau-Lifshitz pseudotensor
- Landau–Lifshitz–Gilbert equation
- Landau–Lifshitz aeroacoustic equation
- Landau–Peierls instability
- Landau–Placzek ratio
- Landau–Pomeranchuk–Migdal effect
- Landau-Raychaudhuri equation
- Landau–Squire jet
- Landau–Yang theorem
- Landau–Zener formula
- Stuart–Landau equation

== Astronomy ==
Two celestial objects are named in his honour:

- the minor planet 2142 Landau.
- the lunar crater Landau.

== Other ==
- Film project DAU
- Korets-Landau leaflet
- Landau Gold Medal
- Landau Institute for Theoretical Physics
