= Landau and Lifshitz =

Landau and Lifshitz, after Lev Landau and Evgeny Lifshitz, may refer to:

- Course of Theoretical Physics, a series of physics textbook written by Lev Landau and Evgeny Lifshitz

It can also refer to

- Landau–Lifshitz equation, various equations developed by Landau and Lifshitz
- Landau–Lifshitz model, a description of magnetic fields
- Landau–Lifshitz–Gilbert equation, describing the precessional motion of magnetization in a solid
- Landau–Lifshitz pseudotensor, a stress-energy-momentum pseudotensor
- The (+1, −1, −1, −1) signature of the metric of the Minkowski space
