= Anatoly Vlasov =

Russian physicist (1908–1975)

- Anatoly Vlasov
- Born: Anatoly Aleksandrovich Vlasov; 20 August [O.S. 7 August] 1908; Balashov, Russian Empire
- Died: 22 December 1975 (aged 67); Moscow, Russian SFSR, Soviet Union
- Education: Moscow State University
- Known for: Development of plasma physics, Vlasov equation
- Awards: Lenin Prize (1970)
- Scientific career
- Fields: Physicist
- Workplaces: Moscow State University
- Doctoral advisor: Igor Tamm
- Doctoral students: Semyon Gershtein

Anatoly Aleksandrovich Vlasov (Russian: Анато́лий Алекса́ндрович Вла́сов; 20 August [O.S. 7 August] 1908 – 22 December 1975) was a Russian-born Soviet theoretical physicist noted for his contributions to the disciplines of statistical mechanics, kinetic theory and plasma physics in particular.

== Biography ==
Anatoly Vlasov was born in Balashov, in the family of a steamfitter. In 1927, he enrolled at Moscow State University (MSU) and graduated from MSU in 1931. After graduating, Vlasov continued to work at MSU for the rest of his life, collaborating with Nobelists Pyotr Kapitsa, Lev Landau, and other leading physicists. He became a full Professor at the Moscow State University in 1944 and was the head of the theoretical physics department in the Faculty of Physics at MSU from 1945 to 1953. He was a member of Communist Party of the USSR since 1944.

In 1970, Vlasov received the Lenin Prize.

== Research ==
Vlasov's research focused on optics, plasma physics, the physics of crystals, the theory of gravitation, and statistical mechanics.

=== Optics ===
Between 1936 and 1938, Vlasov, in collaboration with Vasily Fursov, investigated spectral line broadening in dense gases. Their work introduced the novel idea of incorporating long-range collective interactions between atoms to more accurately describe spectral broadening at high densities.

=== Plasma physics ===
Vlasov received international recognition for his pioneering work in plasma physics, beginning with his 1938 paper on the vibrational properties of an electron gas. (See also the 1968 review.) He demonstrated that the Boltzmann equation is inadequate for describing plasma dynamics due to the long-range collective forces in plasmas. Instead, an equation now known as the Vlasov equation was proposed as the correct description when taking into account the long-range collective forces through a self-consistent field . The field is determined by taking moments of the distribution function described in Vlasov's equation to compute both the charge density and current density. Coupled with Maxwell's equations, the resulting system of differential equations are well-posed assuming appropriate initial conditions and boundary conditions.

The Vlasov equation, which is related to Liouville's equation and the collisionless Boltzmann equation, is fundamental to plasma physics. In 1945, Vlasov showed that this equation, with the collective interactions taken into account, can explain, without any additional hypotheses and specifications, various effects such as the presence and spontaneous origin of eigenfrequencies in polyatomic systems, the spontaneous origin of crystal structure from a gaseous medium, and the presence and spontaneous origin of currents in the media due to the collective interactions between particles.

=== Physics of crystals ===
In crystal physics, Vlasov specifically used the linearized Vlasov equation to study the conditions under which crystal structure can spontaneously emerge in a medium. He derived criteria for the formation of periodic structure based on the system's temperature, density, and the microscopic interactions between its constituent particles.

== See also ==
- Vlasov equation

== Selected publications ==
- A. A. Vlasov (1961). Many-Particle Theory and Its Application to Plasma. New York, Gordon and Breach. ISBN 0-677-20330-6; ISBN 978-0-677-20330-0.
- A. A. Vlasov (1966). Statistical Distribution Functions [in Russian]. Nauka.
- A. A. Vlasov (1978). Nonlocal Statistical Mechanics [in Russian]. Nauka, Moscow.
