= Landau–Lifshitz equation =

In physics, the Landau–Lifshitz equation (LLE), named for Lev Landau and Evgeny Lifshitz, is a name used for several different differential equations

- For the Landau–Lifshitz aeroacoustic equation see aeroacoustics.
- For the Landau–Lifshitz equation describing the precessional motion of magnetization M in a solid with an effective magnetic field H and with damping, see Landau–Lifshitz–Gilbert equation.
- For the Landau–Lifshitz equation describing a magnetic field in 1 + n dimensions see Landau–Lifshitz model.
- For the Landau-Lifshitz equation approximating the Abraham-Lorentz force.
