= Coulomb collision =

Binary elastic collision between two charged particles

A Coulomb collision is a binary elastic collision between two charged particles interacting through their own electric field. As with any inverse-square law, the resulting trajectories of the colliding particles is a hyperbolic Keplerian orbit. This type of collision is common in plasmas where the typical kinetic energy of the particles is too large to produce a significant deviation from the initial trajectories of the colliding particles, and the cumulative effect of many collisions is considered instead. The importance of Coulomb collisions was first pointed out by Lev Landau in 1936, who also derived the corresponding kinetic equation which is known as the Landau kinetic equation.

== Simplified mathematical treatment for plasmas ==
In a plasma, a Coulomb collision rarely results in a large deflection. The cumulative effect of the many small angle collisions, however, is often larger than the effect of the few large angle collisions that occur, so it is instructive to consider the collision dynamics in the limit of small deflections.

We can consider an electron of charge $-e$ and mass $m_\text{e}$ passing a stationary ion of charge $+Ze$ and much larger mass at a distance $b$ with a speed $v$. The perpendicular force is $Ze^2/(4\pi\varepsilon_0 b^2)$ at the closest approach and the duration of the encounter is about $b/v$. The product of these expressions divided by the mass is the change in perpendicular velocity:
$$\Delta m_\text{e} v_\perp \approx \frac{Ze^2}{4\pi\varepsilon_0} \, \frac{1}{vb}$$

Note that the deflection angle is proportional to $1/v^2$. Fast particles are "slippery" and thus dominate many transport processes. The efficiency of velocity-matched interactions is also the reason that fusion products tend to heat the electrons rather than (as would be desirable) the ions. If an electric field is present, the faster electrons feel less drag and become even faster in a "run-away" process.

In passing through a field of ions with density $n$, an electron will have many such encounters simultaneously, with various impact parameters (distance to the ion) and directions. The cumulative effect can be described as a diffusion of the perpendicular momentum. The corresponding diffusion constant is found by integrating the squares of the individual changes in momentum. The rate of collisions with impact parameter between $b$ and $(b + db)$ is $nv (2\pi b \, db)$, so the diffusion constant is given by
$$\begin{align}
D_{v\perp} &=
\int \left(\frac{Ze^2}{4\pi\varepsilon_0} \frac{1}{vb}\right)^2 \, nv \left(2\pi b\, db\right) \\[1ex]
&= \left(\frac{Ze^2}{4\pi\varepsilon_0}\right)^2 \, \frac{2\pi n}{v} \, \int \frac{db}{b}
\end{align}$$

Obviously the integral diverges toward both small and large impact parameters. The divergence at small impact parameters is clearly unphysical since under the assumptions used here, the final perpendicular momentum cannot take on a value higher than the initial momentum. Setting the above estimate for $\Delta m_\text{e} v_\perp$ equal to $mv$, we find the lower cut-off to the impact parameter to be about
$$b_0 = \frac{Ze^2}{4\pi\varepsilon_0} \, \frac{1}{m_\text{e} v^2}$$

We can also use $\pi b_0^2$ as an estimate of the cross section for large-angle collisions. Under some conditions there is a more stringent lower limit due to quantum mechanics, namely the de Broglie wavelength of the electron, $h/m_\text{e} v$ where $h$ is the Planck constant.

At large impact parameters, the charge of the ion is shielded by the tendency of electrons to cluster in the neighborhood of the ion and other ions to avoid it. The upper cut-off to the impact parameter should thus be approximately equal to the Debye length:
$$\lambda_\text{D} = \sqrt{\frac{\varepsilon_0 kT_\text{e}}{n_\text{e} e^2}}$$

== Coulomb logarithm ==
The integral of $1/b$ thus yields the logarithm of the ratio of the upper and lower cut-offs. This number is known as the Coulomb logarithm and is designated by either $\ln \Lambda$ or $\lambda$. It is the factor by which small-angle collisions are more effective than large-angle collisions. The Coulomb logarithm was introduced independently by Lev Landau in 1936 and Subrahmanyan Chandrasekhar in 1943. For many plasmas of interest it takes on values between $5$ and $15$. (For convenient formulas, see pages 34 and 35 of the NRL Plasma formulary.) The limits of the impact parameter integral are not sharp, but are uncertain by factors on the order of unity, leading to theoretical uncertainties on the order of $1/\lambda$. For this reason it is often justified to simply take the convenient choice $\lambda = 10$. The analysis here yields the scalings and orders of magnitude.

== Mathematical treatment for plasmas accounting for all impact parameters ==
An N-body treatment accounting for all impact parameters can be performed by taking into account a few simple facts. The main two ones are: (i) The above change in perpendicular velocity is the lowest order approximation in 1/b of a full Rutherford deflection. Therefore, the above perturbative theory can also be done by using this full deflection. This makes the calculation correct up to the smallest impact parameters where this full deflection must be used. (ii) The effect of Debye shielding for large impact parameters can be accommodated by using a Debye-shielded Coulomb potential (Screening effect Debye length). This cancels the above divergence at large impact parameters. The above Coulomb logarithm turns out to be modified by a constant of order unity.

== History ==
In the 1950s, transport due to collisions in non-magnetized plasmas was simultaneously studied by two groups at University of California, Berkeley's Radiation Laboratory. They quoted each other’s results in their respective papers. The first reference deals with the mean-field part of the interaction by using perturbation theory in electric field amplitude. Within the same approximations, a more elegant derivation of the collisional transport coefficients was provided, by using the Balescu–Lenard equation (see Sec. 8.4 of and Secs. 7.3 and 7.4 of). The second reference uses the Rutherford picture of two-body collisions. The calculation of the first reference is correct for impact parameters much larger than the interparticle distance, while those of the second one work in the opposite case. Both calculations are extended to the full range of impact parameters by introducing each a single ad hoc cutoff, and not two as in the above simplified mathematical treatment, but the transport coefficients depend only logarithmically thereon; both results agree and yield the above expression for the diffusion constant.

== See also ==
- Rutherford scattering
