= Vlasov equation =

Description of the time-evolution of plasma

In plasma physics, the Vlasov equation is a differential equation describing the time evolution of the distribution function of a collisionless plasma consisting of charged particles with long-range interactions, such as Coulomb interactions. The equation was first proposed as a descriptor for plasmas by Anatoly Vlasov in 1938 and was later discussed in greater detail in his monograph. The Vlasov equation, combined with the Landau kinetic equation, describes collisional plasmas.

In astrophysics, the Vlasov gas is used as a model for dark matter dynamics under Newtonian gravity, as dark matter is only known to interact gravitationally.

== Difficulties of the standard kinetic approach ==
Vlasov first argued that the standard kinetic approach, based on the Boltzmann equation, encounters fundamental limitations when applied to plasmas with long-range Coulomb interactions. He identified several difficulties arising from the use of pair-collision-based kinetic theory in plasma dynamics:

1. The pair collisions model is inconsistent with the observations of Rayleigh, Irving Langmuir, and Lewi Tonks, who discovered natural oscillations in electron plasma.
2. The pair collisions model is formally inapplicable to Coulomb interactions due to the divergence of the kinetic terms.
3. It fails to account for experimental results by Harrison Merrill and Harold Webb on anomalous electron scattering in gaseous plasmas.

Vlasov argued that these difficulties arise from the long-range nature of Coulomb interactions. He began with the collisionless Boltzmann equation—sometimes referred to as the Vlasov equation, though anachronistically in this context—expressed in generalized coordinates:
$$\frac{\mathrm d}{\mathrm d t} f(\mathbf  r,\mathbf  p,t) = 0$$

or, explicitly as a PDE:
$$\frac{\partial f}{\partial t} + \frac {\mathrm d\mathbf {r}}{\mathrm dt} \cdot \frac{\partial f}{\partial \mathbf {r}} + \frac {\mathrm d\mathbf {p}}{\mathrm dt} \cdot \frac{\partial f}{\partial \mathbf {p}} = 0,$$

and adapted it to the case of a plasma, leading to the system of equations shown below. Here f is a general distribution function of particles with momentum p at coordinates r and given time t. Note that the term $\frac {\mathrm d\mathbf {p}}{\mathrm dt}$ is the force F acting on the particle.

== The Vlasov–Maxwell system of equations ==
Rather than relying on a collision-based kinetic description for the interaction of charged particles in plasma, Vlasov utilized a self-consistent collective field created by the charged plasma particles. Such a description uses the distribution functions $f_e(\mathbf {r},\mathbf {p},t)$ and $f_i(\mathbf {r},\mathbf {p},t)$ for electrons and plasma cations. The distribution function $f_{\alpha}(\mathbf {r},\mathbf {p},t)$ for a species α describes the number of particles of the species α having approximately the momentum $\mathbf {p}$ near the position $\mathbf {r}$ at time t. Instead of the Boltzmann equation, the following system of equations was proposed as a description of the charged components of a plasma:

$$\frac{\partial f_\alpha}{\partial t} + \mathbf{v}_\alpha \cdot \nabla f_\alpha + q_\alpha \left(\mathbf{E} + \mathbf{v}_\alpha \times \mathbf {B}\right) \cdot \frac{\partial f_\alpha}{\partial\mathbf{p}} = 0$$

$$\begin{align}
\nabla\times\mathbf {B} &= \mu_0 \mathbf{j} + \mu_0\varepsilon_0 \frac{\partial\mathbf{E}}{\partial t}, &
\nabla\cdot\mathbf{B} &= 0, \\
\nabla\times\mathbf{E} &= -\frac{\partial\mathbf {B}}{\partial t}, &
\nabla\cdot\mathbf{E} &= \frac{\rho}{\varepsilon_0},
\end{align}$$

$$\begin{align}
\rho &= \sum_\alpha q_\alpha \int f_\alpha(\mathbf{r}_\alpha, \mathbf{p}_\alpha, t) \, \mathrm{d}^3\mathbf{p},\\
\mathbf {j} &= \sum_\alpha q_\alpha \int  f_\alpha(\mathbf{r}_\alpha, \mathbf{p}_\alpha, t) \mathbf{v}_\alpha \, \mathrm{d}^3\mathbf{p},\\
\mathbf {v}_\alpha &= \frac{\mathbf {p}_\alpha / m_\alpha}{\sqrt{1 + p_\alpha^2 / \left(m_\alpha c\right)^2}}
\end{align}$$

Here c is the speed of light, q_{α} is the charge of each species, m_{α} is the mass of each species, $\mathbf {E}(\mathbf {r},t)$ and $\mathbf {B}(\mathbf {r}, t)$ represent collective self-consistent electromagnetic field created in the point $\mathbf {r}$ at time moment t by all plasma particles. The essential difference of this system of equations from equations for particles in an external electromagnetic field is that the self-consistent electromagnetic field depends in a complex way on the distribution functions of electrons and ions $f_e(\mathbf {r},\mathbf {p},t)$ and $f_i(\mathbf {r},\mathbf {p},t)$.

== The Vlasov–Poisson equation ==
The Vlasov–Poisson equations are an approximation of the Vlasov–Maxwell equations in the non-relativistic zero-magnetic field limit:
$$\frac{\partial f_{\alpha}}{\partial t} + \mathbf {v}_{\alpha} \cdot \frac{\partial f_{\alpha}}{\partial \mathbf {x}}+ \frac{q_{\alpha}\mathbf {E}}{m_{\alpha}} \cdot \frac{\partial f_{\alpha}}{\partial \mathbf {v}} = 0,$$

and Poisson's equation for self-consistent electric field:
$$\nabla^2 \phi +\frac{ \rho }{\varepsilon} = 0.$$

Here q_{α} is the particle's electric charge, m_{α} is the particle's mass, $\mathbf {E}(\mathbf {x},t)$ is the self-consistent electric field, $\phi(\mathbf {x}, t)$ the self-consistent electric potential, ρ is the electric charge density, and $\varepsilon$ is the electric permitivity.

Vlasov–Poisson equations are used to describe various phenomena in plasma, in particular Landau damping and the distributions in a double layer plasma, where they are necessarily strongly non-Maxwellian, and therefore inaccessible to fluid models.

== Moment equations ==
In fluid descriptions of plasmas (see plasma modeling and magnetohydrodynamics (MHD)) one does not consider the velocity distribution. This is achieved by replacing $f(\mathbf r,\mathbf v,t)$ with plasma moments such as number density n, flow velocity u and pressure p. They are named plasma moments because the n-th moment of $f$ can be found by integrating $v^n f$ over velocity. These variables are only functions of position and time, which means that some information is lost. In multifluid theory, the different particle species are treated as different fluids with different pressures, densities and flow velocities. The equations governing the plasma moments are called the moment or fluid equations.

Below the two most used moment equations are presented (in SI units). Deriving the moment equations from the Vlasov equation requires no assumptions about the distribution function.

=== Continuity equation ===
The continuity equation describes how the density changes with time. It can be found by integration of the Vlasov equation over the entire velocity space.
$$\int\frac{\mathrm df}{\mathrm dt} \mathrm{d}^3\mathbf{v} = \int \left(\frac{\partial f}{\partial t} + \mathbf {v} \cdot \frac{\partial f}{\partial \mathbf{r}} + \mathbf {a} \cdot \frac{\partial f}{\partial\mathbf{v}} \right) \mathrm{d}^3\mathbf{v} = 0$$

After some calculations, one ends up with
$$\frac{\partial n}{\partial t} + \nabla\cdot (n\mathbf{u}) = 0.$$

The number density n, and the momentum density nu, are zeroth and first order moments:
$$\begin{align}
n &= \int f(\mathbf{r},\mathbf{v},t) \, \mathrm{d}^3\mathbf{v} \\
n \mathbf u &= \int \mathbf v f(\mathbf{r},\mathbf{v},t) \, \mathrm{d}^3\mathbf{v}
\end{align}$$

=== Momentum equation ===
The rate of change of momentum of a particle is given by the Lorentz equation:
$$m\frac{\mathrm d\mathbf {v}}{\mathrm d t} = q(\mathbf {E} + \mathbf {v} \times \mathbf {B})$$

By using this equation and the Vlasov Equation, the momentum equation for each fluid becomes
$$mn\frac{\mathrm D}{\mathrm D t}\mathbf{u}= -\nabla\cdot \mathcal{P} + qn\mathbf {E} + qn\mathbf{u}\times \mathbf {B},$$
where $\mathcal{P}$ is the pressure tensor. The material derivative is
$$\frac{\mathrm D}{\mathrm D t} = \frac{\partial}{\partial t} + \mathbf u \cdot \nabla.$$

The pressure tensor is defined as the particle mass times the covariance matrix of the velocity:
$$\begin{align}
\cal{P} &= m \int (\mathbf{v} - \mathbf{u}) (\mathbf{v} - \mathbf{u}) f(\mathbf{r},\mathbf{v},t) \, \mathrm{d}^3\mathbf{v} \\
P_{ij} &= m \int (v_i - u_i) (v_j - u_j)f(\mathbf{r},\mathbf{v},t) \, \mathrm{d}^3\mathbf{v}.
\end{align}$$

== The frozen-in approximation ==
As for ideal MHD, the plasma can be considered as tied to the magnetic field lines when certain conditions are fulfilled. One often says that the magnetic field lines are frozen into the plasma. The frozen-in conditions can be derived from Vlasov equation.

We introduce the scales T, L, and V for time, distance and speed respectively. They represent magnitudes of the different parameters which give large changes in $f$. By large we mean that
$$\frac{\partial f}{\partial t}T \sim f \quad \left|\frac{\partial f}{\partial\mathbf r}\right| L \sim f \quad\left|\frac{\partial f}{\partial\mathbf v}\right| V\sim f.$$

We then write
$$t' = \frac{t}{T}, \quad \mathbf r'=\frac{\mathbf r}{L}, \quad \mathbf v' = \frac{\mathbf v}{V}.$$

Vlasov equation can now be written
$$\frac{1}{T} \frac{\partial f}{\partial t'} + \frac{V}{L} \mathbf v' \cdot \frac{\partial f}{\partial \mathbf r'} + \frac{q}{m V} (\mathbf E + V \mathbf v' \times \mathbf B) \cdot \frac{\partial f}{\partial\mathbf v'} = 0.$$

So far no approximations have been done. To be able to proceed we set $V = R \omega_g$, where $\omega_g = qB / m$ is the gyro frequency and R is the gyroradius. By dividing by ω_{g}, we get
$$\frac{1}{\omega_gT}\frac{\partial f}{\partial t'} + \frac{R}{L} \mathbf v' \cdot \frac{\partial f}{\partial \mathbf r'} + \left(\frac{\mathbf  E}{V B} + \mathbf v'\times\frac{\mathbf B}{B}\right) \cdot \frac{\partial f}{\partial\mathbf v'} = 0$$

If $1/\omega_g \ll T$ and $R \ll L$, the two first terms will be much less than $f$ since $\partial f/\partial t' \sim f, v' \lesssim 1$ and $\partial f / \partial \mathbf r' \sim f$ due to the definitions of T, L, and V above. Since the last term is of the order of $f$, we can neglect the two first terms and write
$$\left(\frac{\mathbf  E}{V B} +\mathbf v' \times \frac{\mathbf  B}{B}\right)\cdot\frac{\partial f}{\partial\mathbf v'} \approx 0 \Rightarrow (\mathbf E + \mathbf  v \times\mathbf B)\cdot\frac{\partial f}{\partial\mathbf v} \approx 0$$

This equation can be decomposed into a field aligned and a perpendicular part:
$$\mathbf E_\parallel \frac{\partial f}{\partial\mathbf v_\parallel} + (\mathbf E_\perp + \mathbf v \times \mathbf B) \cdot \frac{\partial f}{\partial\mathbf v_\perp} \approx 0$$

The next step is to write $\mathbf v = \mathbf v_0 + \Delta\mathbf v$, where
$$\mathbf v_0 \times\mathbf B = -\mathbf E_\perp$$

It will soon be clear why this is done. With this substitution, we get
$$\mathbf E_\parallel\frac{\partial f}{\partial\mathbf v_\parallel}+ (\Delta\mathbf v_\perp \times\mathbf B) \cdot \frac{\partial f}{\partial\mathbf v_\perp} \approx 0$$

If the parallel electric field is small,
$$(\Delta \mathbf  v_\perp \times \mathbf B) \cdot \frac{\partial f}{\partial\mathbf v_\perp}\approx 0$$

This equation means that the distribution is gyrotropic. The mean velocity of a gyrotropic distribution is zero. Hence, $\mathbf v_0$ is identical with the mean velocity, u, and we have
$$\mathbf E + \mathbf u \times \mathbf B \approx 0$$

To summarize, the gyro period and the gyro radius must be much smaller than the typical times and lengths which give large changes in the distribution function. The gyro radius is often estimated by replacing V with the thermal velocity or the Alfvén velocity. In the latter case R is often called the inertial length. The frozen-in conditions must be evaluated for each particle species separately. Because electrons have much smaller gyro period and gyro radius than ions, the frozen-in conditions will more often be satisfied.

== See also ==
- Fokker–Planck equation
