= Landau derivative =

In gas dynamics, the Landau derivative or fundamental derivative of gas dynamics, named after Lev Landau who introduced it in 1942, refers to a dimensionless physical quantity characterizing the curvature of the isentrope drawn on the specific volume versus pressure plane. Specifically, the Landau derivative is a second derivative of specific volume with respect to pressure. The derivative is denoted commonly using the symbol $\Gamma$ or $\alpha$ and is defined by

$$\Gamma = \frac{c^4}{2\upsilon^3}\left(\frac{\partial^2\upsilon}{\partial p^2}\right)_s$$

where

- $c$ is the sound speed,
- $\upsilon = 1/\rho$ is the specific volume,
- $\rho$ is the density,
- $p$ is the pressure, and
- $s$ is the specific entropy.

Alternate representations of $\Gamma$ include

$$\begin{align}
\Gamma &= \frac{\upsilon^3}{2c^2} \left(\frac{\partial^2 p}{\partial \upsilon^2}\right)_s
= \frac{1}{c} \left(\frac{\partial \rho c}{\partial \rho}\right)_s
= 1 + \frac{c}{\upsilon} \left(\frac{\partial c}{\partial p}\right)_s \\[2ex]
&= 1 + \frac{c}{\upsilon} \left(\frac{\partial c}{\partial p}\right)_T + \frac{cT}{\upsilon c_p}\left(\frac{\partial\upsilon}{\partial T}\right)_p \left(\frac{\partial c}{\partial T}\right)_p.
\end{align}$$

For most common gases, $\Gamma>0$, whereas abnormal substances such as the BZT fluids exhibit $\Gamma<0$. In an isentropic process, the sound speed increases with pressure when $\Gamma>1$; this is the case for ideal gases. Specifically for polytropic gases (ideal gas with constant specific heats), the Landau derivative is a constant and given by

$$\Gamma = \tfrac{1}{2}(\gamma+1),$$

where $\gamma > 1$ is the specific heat ratio. Some non-ideal gases falls in the range $0 < \Gamma < 1$, for which the sound speed decreases with pressure during an isentropic transformation.

== See also ==
- Landau damping
