= Landau–Placzek ratio =

Landau–Placzek ratio is a ratio of the integrated intensity of Rayleigh scattering to the combined integrated intensity of Brillouin scattering of a triplet frequency spectrum of light scattered by homogenous liquids or gases. The triplet consists of two frequency shifted Brillouin scattering and a central unshifted Rayleigh scattering line split. The triplet structure was explained by Lev Landau and George Placzek in 1934 in a short publication, summarizing major results of their analysis. Landau and Placzek noted in their short paper that a more detailed discussion will be published later although that paper does not seem to have been published. However, a detailed discussion is provided in Lev Landau and Evgeny Lifshitz's book.

The Landau–Placzek ratio is defined as

$$R_{LP} = \frac {I_c} {2I_B}$$

where

- $I_c$ is the integral intensity of central Rayleigh peak
- $I_B$ is the integral intensity of Brillouin peak.

The Landau–Placzek formula provides an approximate theoretical prediction for the Landau–Placzek ratio,

$$R_{LP} = \frac{c_p-c_v}{c_v}$$

where

- $c_p$ is the specific heat at constant pressure
- $c_v$ is the specific heat at constant volume.
