= Landau kinetic equation =

The Landau kinetic equation is a transport equation of weakly coupled charged particles performing Coulomb collisions in a plasma.

The equation was derived by Lev Landau in 1936 as an alternative to the Boltzmann equation in the case of Coulomb interaction. When used with the Vlasov equation, the equation yields the time evolution for collisional plasma, hence it is considered a staple kinetic model in the theory of collisional plasma.

== History ==
The first derivation was given in Landau's original paper. In 1946, the first formal derivation of the equation from the BBGKY hierarchy was published by Nikolay Bogolyubov.

In 1949, William Allis suggested that Landau’s derivation contained an error. Landau responded the following year, demonstrating that Allis’s calculations were themselves incorrect.

== Overview ==
=== Definition ===
Let $f(v, t)$ be a one-particle Distribution function. The equation reads:

$$\frac{\partial f}{\partial t} = B \frac{\partial}{\partial v_i}\left(\int_{\R^3}dw \frac{\left(u^2 \delta_{ij}-u_iu_j\right)}{u^3}\left(\frac{\partial}{\partial v_j} - \frac{\partial}{\partial w_j}\right)f(v)f(w)\right)$$
$$u = v - w$$

The right-hand side of the equation is known as the Landau collision integral (in parallel to the Boltzmann collision integral).

$B$ is obtained by integrating over the intermolecular potential $U(r)$:

$$B = \frac{1}{8 \pi}\int_0^\infty dr \, r^3 \hat{U}(r)^2$$
$$\hat{U}(|k|) = \int_{\R^3} dx \, U(|x|) e^{ikx}$$

For many intermolecular potentials (most notably power laws where $U(r) \propto \frac{1}{r^n}$), the expression for $B$ diverges. Landau's solution to this problem is to introduce Cutoffs at small and large angles.

=== Uses ===
The equation is used primarily in Statistical mechanics and Particle physics to model plasma. As such, it has been used to model and study Plasma in thermonuclear reactors. It has also seen use in modeling of Active matter .

The equation and its properties have been studied in depth by Alexander Bobylev.

== Derivations ==
The rough idea for the derivation:

Assuming a spatially homogenous gas of point particles with unit mass described by $f(v, t)$, one may define a corrected potential for Coulomb interactions, $\hat{U}_{ij} = U_{ij} \exp\left(-\frac{r_{ij}}{r_D}\right)$, where $U_{ij}$ is the Coulomb potential, $U_{ij} = \frac{e_i e_j}{|x_i - x_j|}$, and $r_D$ is the Debye radius. The potential $\hat{U_{ij}}$ is then plugged it into the Boltzmann collision integral (the collision term of the Boltzmann equation) and solved for the main asymptotic term in the limit $r_D \rightarrow \infin$.

== The Fokker-Planck-Landau equation ==
In 1957, the equation was derived independently by Marshall Rosenbluth. Solving the Fokker–Planck equation under an inverse-square force, one may obtain:

$$\frac{1}{4 \pi L} \frac{\partial f_i}{\partial t} = \frac{\partial}{\partial v_{\alpha}} \left(-f_i \frac{\partial h_i}{\partial v_{\alpha}}+\frac{1}{2} \frac{\partial}{\partial v_{\beta}} \left(f_i \frac{\partial^2 g_i}{\partial v_{\alpha} \partial v_{\beta}}\right)\right)$$

where $h_i, g_i$ are the Rosenbluth potentials:

$$h_i = \sum^n_{j=1} K_{ij} \int dw \frac{f_i(w, t)}{|v-w|}$$
$$g_i = \sum^n_{j=1} K_{ij} \frac{m_j}{m_i} \int dw \frac{f_i(w, t)}{|v-w|}$$

for $K_{ij} = \frac{e_i^2 e_j^2}{m_i m_j}, i = 1, 2, \dots, n$

The Fokker-Planck representation of the equation is primarily used for its convenience in numerical calculations.

== The relativistic Landau kinetic equation ==
A relativistic version of the equation was published in 1956 by Gersh Budker and Spartak Belyaev.

Considering relativistic particles with momentum $p = (p^1, p^2, p^3) \in \mathbb{R}^3$ and energy $p^0 = \sqrt{1+|p|^2}$, the equation reads:

$$\frac{\partial f}{\partial t} = \frac{\partial}{\partial p_i}\int_{\R^3} dq \, \Phi^{ij}(p,\ q) \left[h(q)\frac{\partial}{\partial p_j}g(p)-\frac{\partial}{\partial q_j}h(q)g(p)\right]$$

where the kernel is given by $\Phi^{ij} = \Alpha(p, q)S^{ij}(p, q)$ such that:

$$\Alpha = \frac{\left(\rho_- + 1\right)^2}{p^0 q^0} \left(\rho_+ \rho_-\right)^{-3/2}$$
$$S^{ij} = \rho_+ \rho_- \delta_{ij} - \left(p_i-q_i\right)\left(p_j-q_j\right)+\rho_-\left(p_i q_j + p_j q_i\right)$$
$$\rho_{\pm} = p^0 q^0 - pq \pm 1$$

A relativistic correction to the equation is relevant seeing as particle in hot plasma often reach relativistic speeds.

== See also ==
- Boltzmann equation
- Vlasov equation
