= Landau–Peierls instability =

Phenomenon in physics

Landau–Peierls instability refers to the phenomenon in which the mean square displacements due to thermal fluctuations diverge in the thermodynamic limit and is named after Lev Landau (1937) and Rudolf Peierls (1934). This instability prevails in one-dimensional ordering of atoms/molecules in 3D space such as 1D crystals and smectics and also in two-dimensional ordering in 2D space such as a monomolecular adsorbed films at the interface between two isotrophic phases. The divergence is logarithmic, which is rather slow and therefore it is possible to realize substances (such as the smectics) in practice that are subject to Landau–Peierls instability.

== Mathematical description ==
Consider a one-dimensionally ordered crystal in 3D space. The density function is then given by $\rho=\rho(z)$. Since this is a 1D system, only the displacement $u$ along the $z$-direction due to thermal fluctuations can smooth out the density function; displacements in other two directions are irrelevant. The net change in the free energy due to the fluctuations is given by

$$\mathcal F = \int(F-F_0) dV$$

where $F_0$ is the free energy without fluctuations. Note that $\mathcal F$ cannot depend on $u$ or be a linear function of $\nabla u$ because the first case corresponds to a simple uniform translation and the second case is unstable. Thus, $\mathcal F$ must be quadratic in the derivatives of $u$. These are given by

$$\mathcal F = \frac{C}{2}\int dV\left[\left(\frac{\partial u}{\partial z}\right)^2 + \lambda_1 \frac{\partial u}{\partial z}\left(\frac{\partial^2 u}{\partial x^2}+ \frac{\partial^2 u}{\partial y^2}\right) + \lambda_2  \left(\frac{\partial^2 u}{\partial x^2}+ \frac{\partial^2 u}{\partial y^2}\right)^2\right]$$

where $C$, $\lambda_1$ and $\lambda_2$ are material constants; in smectics, where the symmetry $z\mapsto -z$ must be obeyed, the second term has to be set zero, i.e., $\lambda_1=0$. In the Fourier space (in a unit volume), the free energy is just

$$\mathcal F = \frac{1}{(2\pi)^3}\int  d^3k  \frac{C}{2}(k_z^2 + \lambda_1 k_z \kappa^2 + \lambda_2 \kappa^4)|\hat u(k)|^2, \quad \kappa^2 = k_x^2 + k_y^2.$$

From the equipartition theorem (each Fourier mode, on average, is allotted an energy equal to $k_B T/2$) , we can deduce that

$$\langle|\hat u(k)|^2 \rangle = \frac{k_B T}{C(k_z^2 + \lambda_1 k_z \kappa^2 + \lambda_2 \kappa^4)}.$$

The mean square displacement is then given by

$$\langle u^2(r)\rangle = \frac{k_B T}{(2\pi)^3 C} \int_{1/L}^{k_c} \frac{d^3k}{k_z^2 + \lambda_1 k_z \kappa^2 + \lambda_2 \kappa^4}$$

where the integral is cut off at a large wavenumber that is comparable to the linear dimension of the element undergoing deformation. In the thermodynamic limit, $L\to \infty$, the integral diverges logarithmically. This means that an element at a particular point is displaced through very large distances and therefore smooths out the function $\rho(z)$, leaving $\rho=$constant as the only solution and destroying the 1D ordering.

== See also ==
- Peierls transition
