= Landau distribution =

Probability distribution

- Probability density function $\mu=0,\; c=\pi/2$
- Parameters: $c \in(0,\infty)$ — scale parameter $\mu\in(-\infty,\infty)$ — location parameter
- Support: $\mathbb{R}$
- PDF: $\frac{1}{\pi c}\int_0^\infty e^{-t} \cos\left(\left(x-\mu\right) \frac{t}{c} + \frac{2t}{\pi} \ln\frac{t}{c}\right)\, dt$
- Mean: Undefined
- Variance: Undefined
- MGF: Undefined
- CF: $\exp\left(it\mu -\frac{2ict}{\pi}\log|t| - c|t|\right)$

In probability theory, the Landau distribution is a probability distribution named after Lev Landau who used it in 1944.

Because of the distribution's "fat" tail, the moments of the distribution, such as mean or variance, are undefined. The distribution is a particular case of stable distribution.

== Definition ==
The probability density function, as written originally by Landau, is defined by the complex integral:

$$p(x) = \frac{1}{2 \pi i} \int_{a-i\infty}^{a+i\infty} e^{s \ln s + x s}\, ds ,$$

where a is an arbitrary positive real number, meaning that the integration path can be any parallel to the imaginary axis, intersecting the real positive semi-axis, and $\ln$ refers to the natural logarithm. In other words, it is the inverse Laplace transform of the function $s^s$.

The following real integral is equivalent to the above:

$$p(x) = \frac{1}{\pi} \int_0^\infty e^{-t \ln t - x t} \sin(\pi t)\, dt.$$

The full family of Landau distributions is obtained by extending the original distribution to a location-scale family of stable distributions with parameters $\alpha=1$ and $\beta=1$, with characteristic function:

$$\varphi(t;\mu,c)=\exp\left(it\mu -\tfrac{2ict}{\pi}\ln|t|-c|t|\right)$$

where $c\in(0,\infty)$ and $\mu\in(-\infty,\infty)$, which yields a density function:

$$p(x;\mu,c) = \frac{1}{\pi c}\int_{0}^{\infty} e^{-t} \cos\left(\left(x-\mu\right) \frac{t}{c} + \frac{2t}{\pi}\ln \frac{t}{c}\right)\, dt ,$$

Taking $\mu = 0$ and $c = \frac{\pi}{2}$ we get the original form of $p(x)$ above.

== Properties ==
The approximation function for $\mu=0,\,c=1$

- Translation: If $X \sim \textrm{Landau}(\mu,c)\,$ then $X + m \sim \textrm{Landau}(\mu + m , \, c) \,$.
- Scaling: If $X \sim \textrm{Landau}(\mu,c)\,$ then $aX \sim \textrm{Landau}(a\mu - \tfrac{2}{\pi}ac\ln a, \, ac)$.
- Sum: If $X \sim \textrm{Landau}(\mu_1, c_1)$ and $Y \sim \textrm{Landau}(\mu_2, c_2) \,$ then $X+Y \sim \textrm{Landau}(\mu_1+\mu_2, \, c_1+c_2)$.

These properties can all be derived from the characteristic function. Together they imply that the Landau distributions are closed under affine transformations.

=== Approximations ===
In the "standard" case $\mu = 0$ and $c = \pi/2$, the pdf can be approximated using Lindhard theory which says:

$$p(x+\ln x - 1 + \gamma) \approx \frac{\exp(-1/x)}{x(1+x)},$$

where $\gamma$ is Euler's constant.

A similar approximation of $p(x;\mu,c)$ for $\mu = 0$ and $c = 1$ is:

$$p(x) \approx \frac{1}{\sqrt{2\pi}}\exp\left(-\frac{x + e^{-x}}{2}\right).$$

== Applications ==
In nuclear and particle physics, the Landau distribution appears as a probability that a fast particle with a given initial energy will lose a given energy after passing the layer of matter with given thickness.

== Related distributions ==
- The Landau distribution is a stable distribution with stability parameter $\alpha$ and skewness parameter $\beta$ both equal to 1.
