= Landau–Hopf theory of turbulence =

Physical theory

In physics, the Landau–Hopf theory of turbulence, named for Lev Landau and Eberhard Hopf, was until the mid-1970s, the accepted theory of how a fluid flow becomes turbulent. It states that as a fluid flows faster, it develops more Fourier modes. At first, a few modes dominate, but under stronger conditions, it forces the modes to become power-law distributed as explained in Kolmogorov's theory of turbulence.
