= Landau–Levich problem =

In fluid dynamics, Landau–Levich flow or the Landau–Levich problem describes the flow created by a moving plate which is pulled out of a liquid surface. Landau–Levich flow finds many applications in thin film coating. The solution to the problem was described by Lev Landau and Veniamin Levich in 1942. The problem assumes that the plate is dragged out of the liquid slowly, so that the three major forces which are in balance are viscous force, the force due to gravity, and the force due to surface tension.

== Problem ==
Landau and Levich split the entire flow regime into two regimes, a lower regime and an upper regime. In the lower regime closer to the liquid surface, the flow is assumed to be static, leading to the problem of the Young–Laplace equation (a static meniscus). In the upper region far away from the liquid surface, the thickness of the liquid layer attaching to the plate is very small and also since the velocity of the plate is small, this regime comes under the approximation of lubrication theory. The solution of these two problems are then matched using method of matched asymptotic expansions.
