= Landau–Yang theorem =

In quantum mechanics, the Landau–Yang theorem is a selection rule for particles that decay into two on-shell photons. The theorem states that a massive particle with spin 1 cannot decay into two photons. It is named after the work of Lev Landau in 1948 and C.N. Yang in 1950.

== Assumptions ==
A photon here is any particle with spin 1, without mass and without internal degrees of freedom. The photon is the only known particle with these properties.

== Consequences ==
The theorem has several consequences in particle physics. For example:

- The ρ meson cannot decay into two photons, differently from the neutral pion, that almost always decays into this final state (98.8% of times).
- The Z boson cannot decay into two photons.
- The Higgs boson, whose decay into two photons was observed in 2012, cannot have spin 1 in models that assume the Landau–Yang theorem. Measurements taken in 2013 have since confirmed that the Higgs has spin 0.
