= Landau–Pomeranchuk–Migdal effect =

Phenomena in particle physics

In high-energy physics, the Landau–Pomeranchuk–Migdal effect, also known as the Landau–Pomeranchuk effect and the Pomeranchuk effect, or simply LPM effect, is a reduction of the bremsstrahlung and pair production cross sections at high energies or high matter densities. It is named in honor of Lev Landau, Isaak Pomeranchuk and Arkady Migdal.

== Overview ==
A high energy particle undergoing multiple soft scatterings from a medium will experience interference effects between adjacent scattering sites. From uncertainty as the longitudinal momentum transfer gets small the particles wavelength will increase, if the wavelength becomes longer than the mean free path in the medium (the average distance between scattering sites) then the scatterings can no longer be treated as independent events. This is the LPM effect. The Bethe–Heitler spectrum for multiple scattering induced radiation assumes that the scatterings are independent, the quantum interference between successive scatterings caused by the LPM effect leads to suppression of the radiation spectrum relative to that predicted by Bethe–Heitler.

The suppression occurs in different parts of the emission spectrum, for quantum electrodynamics (QED) small photon energies are suppressed, and for quantum chromodynamics (QCD) large gluon energies are suppressed. In QED the rescattering of the high energy electron dominates the process, in QCD the emitted gluons carry color charge and interact with the medium also. Since the gluons are soft their rescattering will provide the dominant modification to the spectrum.

Lev Landau and Isaak Pomeranchuk showed that the formulas for bremsstrahlung and pair creation in matter which had been formulated by Hans Bethe and Walter Heitler (the Bethe–Heitler formula) were inapplicable at high energy or high matter density. The effect of multiple Coulomb scattering by neighboring atoms reduces the cross sections for pair production and bremsstrahlung. Arkady Migdal developed a formula applicable at high energies or high matter densities which accounted for these effects.

In 1994 a team of physicists at SLAC National Accelerator Laboratory experimentally confirmed the Landau–Pomeranchuk–Migdal effect.
