= Stress–energy–momentum pseudotensor =

Quantity in general relativity

In the theory of general relativity, a stress–energy–momentum pseudotensor, such as the Landau–Lifshitz pseudotensor, is an extension of the non-gravitational stress–energy tensor that incorporates the energy–momentum of gravity. It allows the energy–momentum of a system of gravitating matter to be defined. In particular it allows the total of matter plus the gravitating energy–momentum to form a conserved current within the framework of general relativity, so that the total energy–momentum crossing the hypersurface (3-dimensional boundary) of any compact space–time hypervolume (4-dimensional submanifold) vanishes.

Some people (such as Erwin Schrödinger) have objected to this derivation on the grounds that pseudotensors are inappropriate objects in general relativity, but the conservation law only requires the use of the 4-divergence of a pseudotensor which is, in this case, a tensor (which also vanishes). Mathematical developments in the 1980s have allowed pseudotensors to be understood as sections of jet bundles, thus providing a firm theoretical foundation for the concept of pseudotensors in general relativity.

== Landau–Lifshitz pseudotensor ==
The Landau–Lifshitz pseudotensor, a stress–energy–momentum pseudotensor for gravity, when combined with terms for matter (including photons and neutrinos), allows the energy–momentum conservation laws to be extended into general relativity.

=== Requirements ===
Landau and Lifshitz were led by four requirements in their search for a gravitational energy momentum pseudotensor, $t_\text{LL}^{\mu \nu}$:

1. that it be constructed entirely from the metric tensor, so as to be purely geometrical or gravitational in origin.
2. that it be index symmetric, i.e. $t_\text{LL}^{\mu \nu} = t_\text{LL}^{\nu \mu}$, (to conserve angular momentum)
3. that, when added to the stress–energy tensor of matter, $T^{\mu \nu}$, its total ordinary 4-divergence (∂_{μ}, not ∇_{μ}) vanishes so that we have a conserved expression for the total stress–energy–momentum. (This is required of any conserved current.)
4. that it vanish locally in an inertial frame of reference (which requires that it only contains first order and not second or higher order derivatives of the metric). This is because the equivalence principle requires that the gravitational force field, the Christoffel symbols, vanish locally in some frames. If gravitational energy is a function of its force field, as is usual for other forces, then the associated gravitational pseudotensor should also vanish locally.

=== Definition ===
Landau and Lifshitz showed that there is a unique construction that satisfies these requirements, namely
$$t_\text{LL}^{\mu \nu} = - \frac{1}{\kappa}G^{\mu \nu} + \frac{1}{2 \kappa (-g)}\left((-g)\left(g^{\mu \nu} g^{\alpha \beta} - g^{\mu \alpha}g^{\nu \beta}\right)\right)_{,\alpha \beta}$$
where:

- G^{μν} is the Einstein tensor (which is constructed from the metric)
- g^{μν} is the inverse of the metric tensor, g_{μν}
- g = det(g_{μν}) is the determinant of the metric tensor. g < 0, hence its appearance as $-g$.
- ${}_{,\alpha \beta} = \frac{\partial^2}{\partial x^{\alpha} \partial x^{\beta}}$ are partial derivatives, not covariant derivatives
- κ = 8πG/c^{4} is the Einstein gravitational constant
- G is the Newtonian constant of gravitation

=== Verification ===
Examining the 4 requirement conditions we can see that the first 3 are relatively easy to demonstrate:

1. Since the Einstein tensor, $G^{\mu \nu}$, is itself constructed from the metric, so therefore is $t_\text{LL}^{\mu \nu}$
2. Since the Einstein tensor, $G^{\mu \nu}$, is symmetric so is $t_\text{LL}^{\mu \nu}$ since the additional terms are symmetric by inspection.
3. The Landau–Lifshitz pseudotensor is constructed so that when added to the stress–energy tensor of matter, $T^{\mu \nu}$, its total 4-divergence vanishes: $\left(\left(-g\right)\left(T^{\mu \nu} + t_\text{LL}^{\mu \nu}\right)\right)_{,\mu} = 0$. This follows from the cancellation of the Einstein tensor, $G^{\mu \nu}$, with the stress–energy tensor, $T^{\mu \nu}$ by the Einstein field equations; the remaining term vanishes algebraically due to the commutativity of partial derivatives applied across antisymmetric indices.
4. The Landau–Lifshitz pseudotensor appears to include second derivative terms in the metric, but in fact the explicit second derivative terms in the pseudotensor cancel with the implicit second derivative terms contained within the Einstein tensor, $G^{\mu \nu}$. This is more evident when the pseudotensor is directly expressed in terms of the metric tensor or the Levi-Civita connection; only the first derivative terms in the metric survive and these vanish where the frame is locally inertial at any chosen point. As a result, the entire pseudotensor vanishes locally (again, at any chosen point) $t_\text{LL}^{\mu \nu} = 0$, which demonstrates the delocalisation of gravitational energy–momentum.

=== Cosmological constant ===
When the Landau–Lifshitz pseudotensor was formulated it was commonly assumed that the cosmological constant, $\Lambda$, was zero. Nowadays, that assumption is suspect, and the expression frequently gains a $\Lambda$ term, giving:
$$t_\text{LL}^{\mu \nu} = - \frac{1}{\kappa} \left(G^{\mu \nu} + \Lambda g^{\mu \nu}\right) + \frac{1}{2 \kappa (-g)} \left(\left(-g\right)\left(g^{\mu \nu}g^{\alpha \beta} - g^{\mu \alpha}g^{\nu \beta}\right)\right)_{,\alpha \beta}$$

This is necessary for consistency with the Einstein field equations.

=== Metric and affine connection versions ===
Landau and Lifshitz also provide two equivalent but longer expressions for the Landau–Lifshitz pseudotensor:

- Metric tensor version:
  $$\begin{align}
(-g)\left(t_\text{LL}^{\mu \nu} + \frac{\Lambda g^{\mu \nu}}{\kappa}\right) = \frac{1}{2 \kappa}\bigg[&\left(\sqrt{-g}g^{\mu \nu}\right)_{,\alpha}\left(\sqrt{-g}g^{\alpha \beta}\right)_{,\beta} - \left(\sqrt{-g}g^{\mu \alpha}\right)_{,\alpha}\left(\sqrt{-g}g^{\nu \beta}\right)_{,\beta} + {} \\
&\frac{1}{8}\left(2g^{\mu \alpha}g^{\nu \beta}-g^{\mu \nu}g^{\alpha \beta}\right)\left(2g_{\sigma \rho}g_{\lambda \omega}-g_{\rho \lambda}g_{\sigma \omega}\right)\left(\sqrt{-g}g^{\sigma \omega}\right)_{,\alpha}\left(\sqrt{-g}g^{\rho \lambda}\right)_{,\beta} - {} \\
&\left(g^{\mu \alpha}g_{\beta \sigma}\left(\sqrt{-g}g^{\nu \sigma}\right)_{,\rho}\left(\sqrt{-g}g^{\beta \rho}\right)_{,\alpha}+g^{\nu \alpha}g_{\beta \sigma}\left(\sqrt{-g}g^{\mu \sigma}\right)_{,\rho}\left(\sqrt{-g}g^{\beta \rho}\right)_{,\alpha}\right) + {} \\
&\left.\frac{1}{2}g^{\mu \nu}g_{\alpha \beta}\left(\sqrt{-g}g^{\alpha \sigma}\right)_{,\rho}\left(\sqrt{-g}g^{\rho \beta}\right)_{,\sigma} + g_{\alpha \beta}g^{\sigma \rho}\left(\sqrt{-g}g^{\mu \alpha}\right)_{,\sigma}\left(\sqrt{-g}g^{\nu \beta}\right)_{,\rho}\right]
\end{align}$$
- Affine connection version:
  $$\begin{align}
t_\text{LL}^{\mu \nu} + \frac{\Lambda g^{\mu \nu}}{\kappa} = \frac{1}{2 \kappa}\Big[
&\left(2\Gamma^{\sigma}_{\alpha \beta}\Gamma^{\rho}_{\sigma \rho} - \Gamma^{\sigma}_{\alpha \rho}\Gamma^{\rho}_{\beta \sigma} - \Gamma^{\sigma}_{\alpha \sigma}\Gamma^{\rho}_{\beta \rho}\right)\left(g^{\mu \alpha}g^{\nu \beta} - g^{\mu \nu}g^{\alpha \beta}\right) + {}\\
&\left(\Gamma^{\nu}_{\alpha \rho}\Gamma^{\rho}_{\beta \sigma} + \Gamma^{\nu}_{\beta \sigma} \Gamma^{\rho}_{\alpha \rho} - \Gamma^{\nu}_{\sigma \rho} \Gamma^{\rho}_{\alpha \beta} - \Gamma^{\nu}_{\alpha \beta} \Gamma^{\rho}_{\sigma \rho}\right)g^{\mu \alpha}g^{\beta \sigma} + \\
&\left(\Gamma^{\mu}_{\alpha \rho}\Gamma^{\rho}_{\beta \sigma}+\Gamma^{\mu}_{\beta \sigma} \Gamma^{\rho}_{\alpha \rho} - \Gamma^{\mu}_{\sigma \rho} \Gamma^{\rho}_{\alpha \beta} - \Gamma^{\mu}_{\alpha \beta} \Gamma^{\rho}_{\sigma \rho}\right)g^{\nu \alpha}g^{\beta \sigma} + \\
&\left.\left(\Gamma^{\mu}_{\alpha \sigma} \Gamma^{\nu}_{\beta \rho} - \Gamma^{\mu}_{\alpha \beta} \Gamma^{\nu}_{\sigma \rho}\right)g^{\alpha \beta}g^{\sigma \rho}\right]
\end{align}$$

This definition of energy–momentum is covariantly applicable not just under Lorentz transformations, but also under general coordinate transformations.

== Einstein pseudotensor ==
This pseudotensor was originally developed by Albert Einstein.

Paul Dirac showed that the mixed Einstein pseudotensor
$${t_\mu}^\nu = \frac{1}{2 \kappa \sqrt{-g}} \left( \left(g^{\alpha\beta}\sqrt{-g}\right)_{,\mu} \left(\Gamma^\nu_{\alpha\beta} - \delta^\nu_\beta \Gamma^\sigma_{\alpha\sigma}\right) - \delta_\mu^\nu g^{\alpha\beta} \left(\Gamma^\sigma_{\alpha\beta} \Gamma^\rho_{\sigma\rho} - \Gamma^\rho_{\alpha\sigma} \Gamma^\sigma_{\beta\rho}\right)\sqrt{-g} \right)$$
satisfies a conservation law
$$\left(\left({T_\mu}^\nu + {t_\mu}^\nu\right)\sqrt{-g}\right)_{,\nu} = 0 .$$

Clearly this pseudotensor for gravitational stress–energy is constructed exclusively from the metric tensor and its first derivatives. Consequently, it vanishes at any event when the coordinate system is chosen to make the first derivatives of the metric vanish because each term in the pseudotensor is quadratic in the first derivatives of the metric tensor field. However it is not symmetric, and is therefore not suitable as a basis for defining the angular momentum.

== See also ==
- Bel–Robinson tensor
- Gravitational wave
