= Landau damping =

Effect in physics

In physics, Landau damping is a mechanism by which oscillations in a charged medium (typically a plasma) are damped by non-collisional interactions with said medium. It is named after its discoverer, Soviet physicist Lev Davidovich Landau (1908–68). As the oscillation moves through the medium with phase velocity $v_\text{ph}$ it will accelerate slightly slower particles and decelerate slightly faster particles; if the former outnumber the latter (such as if the oscillation is travelling faster than the modal velocity of a Maxwell–Boltzmann distribution) the oscillation will lose its energy to drag and thus be damped. This phenomenon prevents an instability from developing, and creates a region of stability in the parameter space. It was later argued by Donald Lynden-Bell that a similar phenomenon was occurring in galactic dynamics, where the gas of electrons interacting by electrostatic forces is replaced by a "gas of stars" interacting by gravitational forces. Landau damping can be manipulated exactly in numerical simulations such as particle-in-cell simulation. It was proved to exist experimentally by Malmberg and Wharton in 1964, almost two decades after its prediction by Landau in 1946.

== Wave–particle interactions ==
Landau damping occurs because of the energy exchange between an electromagnetic wave with phase velocity $v_\text{ph}$ and particles in the plasma with velocity approximately equal to $v_\text{ph}$, which can interact strongly with the wave. Those particles having velocities slightly less than $v_\text{ph}$ will be accelerated by the electric field of the wave to move with the wave phase velocity, while those particles with velocities slightly greater than $v_\text{ph}$ will be decelerated losing energy to the wave: particles tend to synchronize with the wave. This is proved experimentally with a traveling-wave tube.

In an ideal magnetohydrodynamic (MHD) plasma the particle velocities are often taken to be approximately a Maxwellian distribution function. If the slope of the function is negative, the number of particles with velocities slightly less than the wave phase velocity is greater than the number of particles with velocities slightly greater. Hence, there are more particles gaining energy from the wave than losing to the wave, which leads to wave damping. If, however, the slope of the function is positive, the number of particles with velocities slightly less than the wave phase velocity is smaller than the number of particles with velocities slightly greater. Hence, there are more particles losing energy to the wave than gaining from the wave, which leads to a resultant increase in the wave energy. Then Landau damping is substituted with Landau growth.

== Physical interpretation ==
The mathematical theory of Landau damping is somewhat involved. However, in the case of waves with finite amplitude, there is a simple physical interpretation which, though not strictly correct, helps to visualize this phenomenon.

Sailboats (or surfers) catching an ocean wave are sped up and slowed down to match the wave speed.

It is possible to imagine Langmuir waves as waves in the sea, and the particles as surfers trying to catch the wave, all moving in the same direction. If the surfer is moving on the water surface at a velocity slightly less than the waves they will eventually be caught and pushed along the wave (gaining energy), while a surfer moving slightly faster than a wave will be pushing on the wave as they move uphill (losing energy to the wave).

It is worth noting that only the surfers are playing an important role in this energy interactions with the waves; a beachball floating on the water (zero velocity) will go up and down as the wave goes by, not gaining energy at all. Also, a boat that moves faster than the waves does not exchange much energy with the wave.

Electrons in an initially Maxwellian plasma move through one-dimensional phase space in the presence of an electrostatic wave.

A somewhat more detailed picture is obtained by considering particles' trajectories in phase space, in the wave's frame of reference. Particles near the phase velocity become trapped and are forced to move with the wavefronts, at the phase velocity. Any such particles that were initially below the phase velocity have thus been accelerated, while any particles that were initially above the phase velocity have been decelerated. Because, for a Maxwellian plasma, there are initially more particles below the phase velocity than above it, the plasma has net gained energy, and the wave has therefore lost energy.

A simple mechanical description of particle dynamics provides a quantitative estimate of the synchronization of particles with the wave. A more rigorous approach shows the strongest synchronization occurs for particles with a velocity in the wave frame proportional to the damping rate and independent of the wave amplitude. Since Landau damping occurs for waves with arbitrarily small amplitudes, this shows the most active particles in this damping are far from being trapped. This is natural, since trapping involves diverging time scales for such waves (specifically $T_\text{trap} \sim A^{-1/2}$ for a wave amplitude $A$).

== Mathematical treatment ==
=== Perturbation theory in a Vlasovian frame ===
Theoretical treatment starts with the Vlasov equation in the non-relativistic zero-magnetic field limit, the Vlasov–Poisson set of equations. Explicit solutions are obtained in the limit of a small $E$-field. The distribution function $f$ and field $E$ are expanded in a series: $f = f_0(v) + f_1(x,v,t) + \cdots$, $E = E_1(x,t) + E_2(x,t) + \cdots$ and terms of equal order are collected.

To first order the Vlasov–Poisson equations read
$$(\partial_t + v\partial_x)f_1 + {e\over m}E_1 f'_0 = 0, \quad
\partial_x E_1 = {e\over \epsilon_0} \int f_1 \mathrm{d}v.$$

Landau calculated the wave caused by an initial disturbance $f_1(x,v,0) = g(v)\exp(ikx)$ and found by aid of Laplace transform and contour integration a damped travelling wave of the form $\exp[ik(x-v_\text{ph}t)-\gamma t]$ with wave number $k$ and damping decrement
$$\gamma\approx-{\pi\omega_p^3 \over 2k^2N} f'_0(v_\text{ph}), \quad
N = \int f_0 \mathrm{d}v.$$

Here $\omega_p$ is the plasma oscillation frequency and $N$ is the electron density. Later Nico van Kampen proved that the same result can be obtained with Fourier transform. He showed that the linearized Vlasov–Poisson equations have a continuous spectrum of singular normal modes, now known as van Kampen modes:
$$\frac{\omega_p^2}{kN} f'_0 \frac{\mathcal P}{kv-\omega} + \epsilon \delta\left(v-\frac{\omega}{k}\right)$$
Here, $\mathcal P$ signifies principal value, $\delta$ is the delta function (see generalized function) and
$$\epsilon = 1 + \frac{\omega_p^2}{kN} \int f'_0 \frac{\mathcal P}{\omega-kv} \mathrm{d}v$$
is the plasma permittivity. Decomposing the initial disturbance in these modes yields the Fourier spectrum of the resulting wave. Damping is explained by phase-mixing of these Fourier modes with slightly different frequencies near $\omega_p$.

Damping in a collisionless plasma, however, raised the question of what might absorb the energy. In fluid theory, in which the plasma is modeled as a dispersive dielectric medium, the energy of Langmuir waves is known: field energy multiplied by the Brillouin factor $\partial_\omega(\omega\epsilon)$. But damping cannot be derived in this model. To calculate energy exchange of the wave with resonant electrons, Vlasov plasma theory has to be expanded to second order and problems about suitable initial conditions and secular terms arise.

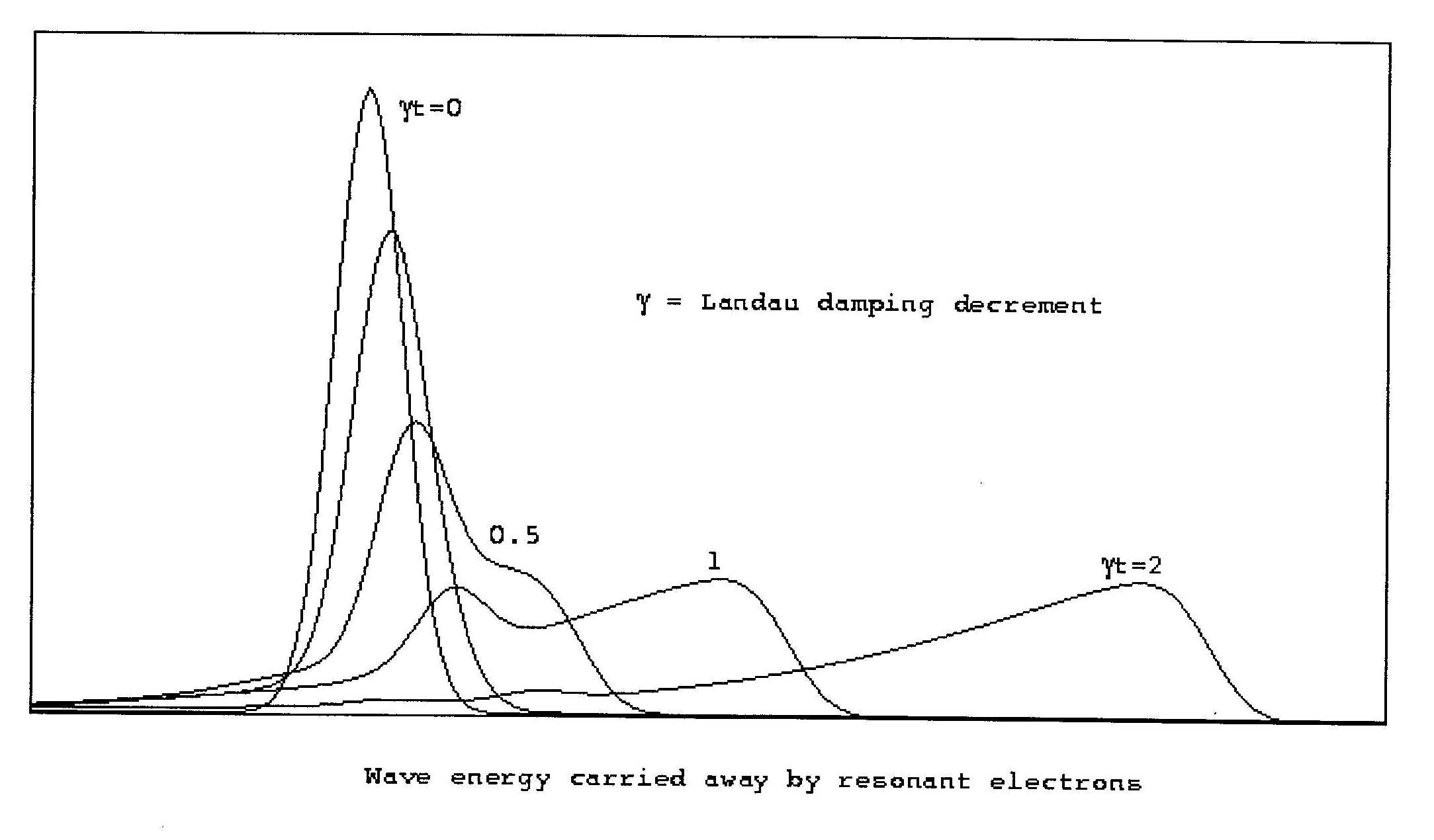

In Ref. these problems are studied. Because calculations for an infinite wave are deficient in second order, a wave packet is analysed. Second-order initial conditions are found that suppress secular behavior and excite a wave packet of which the energy agrees with fluid theory. The figure shows the energy density of a wave packet traveling at the group velocity, its energy being carried away by electrons moving at the phase velocity. Total energy, the area under the curves, is conserved.

=== The Cauchy problem for perturbative solutions ===
The rigorous mathematical theory is based on solving the Cauchy problem for the evolution equation (here the partial differential Vlasov–Poisson equation) and proving estimates on the solution.

First a rather complete linearized mathematical theory has been developed since Landau.

Going beyond the linearized equation and dealing with the nonlinearity has been a longstanding problem in the mathematical theory of Landau damping. Previously one mathematical result at the non-linear level was the existence of a class of exponentially damped solutions of the Vlasov–Poisson equation in a circle which had been proved in by means of a scattering technique (this result has been recently extended in). However these existence results do not say anything about which initial data could lead to such damped solutions.

In a paper published by French mathematicians Cédric Villani and Clément Mouhot, the initial data issue is solved and Landau damping is mathematically established for the first time for the non-linear Vlasov equation. It is proved that solutions starting in some neighborhood (for the analytic or Gevrey topology) of a linearly stable homogeneous stationary solution are (orbitally) stable for all times and are damped globally in time. The damping phenomenon is reinterpreted in terms of transfer of regularity of $f$ as a function of $x$ and $v$, respectively, rather than exchanges of energy. Large scale variations pass into variations of smaller and smaller scale in velocity space, corresponding to a shift of the Fourier spectrum of $f$ as a function of $v$. This shift, well known in linear theory, proves to hold in the non-linear case.

=== Perturbation theory in an N-body frame ===
The mechanical N-body description, originally deemed impossible, enables a rigorous calculation of Landau damping using Newton's second law of motion and Fourier series. Neither the Vlasov equation nor Laplace transforms are required for this derivation. The calculation of the energy (more precisely momentum) exchange of the wave with electrons is done similarly. This calculation makes intuitive the interpretation of Landau damping as the synchronization of almost resonant passing particles.
