= Landau–Lifshitz model =

Description of magnetic fields

In solid-state physics, the Landau–Lifshitz equation (LLE), named for Lev Landau and Evgeny Lifshitz, is a partial differential equation describing time evolution of magnetism in solids, depending on 1 time variable and 1, 2, or 3 space variables.

== Landau–Lifshitz equation ==
The LLE describes an anisotropic magnet. The equation is described in (Faddeev & Takhtajan 2007, p. 457) as follows: it is an equation for a vector field S, in other words a function on R^{1+n} taking values in R^{3}. The equation depends on a fixed symmetric 3-by-3 matrix J, usually assumed to be diagonal; that is, $J=\operatorname{diag}(J_{1}, J_{2}, J_{3})$. The LLE is then given by Hamilton's equation of motion for the Hamiltonian

$$H=\frac{1}{2}\int \left[\sum_i\left(\frac{\partial \mathbf{S}}{\partial x_i}\right)^{2}-J(\mathbf{S})\right]\, dx\qquad (1)$$

(where J(S) is the quadratic form of J applied to the vector S) which is

$$\frac{\partial \mathbf{S}}{\partial t} = \mathbf{S}\wedge \sum_i\frac{\partial^2 \mathbf{S}}{\partial  x_i^{2}} + \mathbf{S}\wedge J\mathbf{S}.\qquad (2)$$

In 1+1 dimensions, this equation is

$$\frac{\partial \mathbf{S}}{\partial t} = \mathbf{S}\wedge \frac{\partial^2 \mathbf{S}}{\partial  x^{2}} + \mathbf{S}\wedge J\mathbf{S}.\qquad (3)$$

In 2+1 dimensions, this equation takes the form

$$\frac{\partial \mathbf{S}}{\partial t} = \mathbf{S}\wedge \left(\frac{\partial^2 \mathbf{S}}{\partial  x^{2}} + \frac{\partial^2 \mathbf{S}}{\partial  y^{2}}\right)+  \mathbf{S}\wedge J\mathbf{S}\qquad (4)$$

which is the (2+1)-dimensional LLE. For the (3+1)-dimensional case, the LLE looks like

$$\frac{\partial \mathbf{S}}{\partial t} = \mathbf{S}\wedge \left(\frac{\partial^2 \mathbf{S}}{\partial  x^{2}} + \frac{\partial^2 \mathbf{S}}{\partial  y^{2}}+\frac{\partial^2 \mathbf{S}}{\partial  z^{2}}\right)+  \mathbf{S}\wedge J\mathbf{S}.\qquad (5)$$

== Integrable reductions ==
In the general case LLE (2) is nonintegrable, but it admits two integrable reductions:

a) in 1+1 dimensions, that is Eq. (3), it is integrable
b) when $J=0$. In this case the (1+1)-dimensional LLE (3) turns into the continuous classical Heisenberg ferromagnet equation (see e.g. Heisenberg model (classical)) which is already integrable.

== See also ==
- Nonlinear Schrödinger equation
- Heisenberg model (classical)
- Spin wave
- Micromagnetism
- Ishimori equation
- Magnet
- Ferromagnetism
