= Evgeny Lifshitz =

Soviet physicist (1915–1985)

- Евгений Лифшиц
- Born: 21 February 1915; Kharkov, Kharkov Governorate, Russian Empire
- Died: 29 October 1985 (aged 70); Moscow, Russian SFSR, Soviet Union
- Known for: Lifshitz theory of van der Waals force Landau–Lifshitz–Gilbert equation Landau–Lifshitz model BKL singularity Lifschitz point Landau–Lifshitz force Landau–Lifshitz pseudotensor Landau–Lifshitz aeroacoustic equation Course of Theoretical Physics
- Awards: Lenin Prize
- Scientific career
- Fields: Physics
- Institutions: University of Kharkov; Kharkov Polytechnic Institute
- Doctoral advisor: Lev Landau
- Doctoral students: Lev Pitaevskii

Evgeny Mikhailovich Lifshitz ForMemRS (Russian: Евгений Михайлович Лифшиц; Ukrainian: Євген Михайлович Ліфшиць, romanized: Yevhen Mykhailovych Lifshyts; 21 February 1915 – 29 October 1985) was a Soviet physicist and brother of the physicist Ilya Lifshitz.

== Work ==
Born into a Jewish family in Kharkov, Kharkov Governorate, Russian Empire (now Kharkiv, Ukraine). Lifshitz is well known in the field of general relativity for coauthoring the BKL conjecture concerning the nature of a generic curvature singularity. As of 2006, this is widely regarded as one of the most important open problems in the subject of classical gravitation.

With Lev Landau, Lifshitz co-authored Course of Theoretical Physics, an ambitious series of physics textbooks, in which the two aimed to provide a graduate-level introduction to the entire field of physics. These books are still considered invaluable and continue to be widely used.

Lifshitz was the second of only 43 people ever to pass Landau's "Theoretical Minimum" examination. He made many invaluable contributions, in particular to quantum electrodynamics, where he calculated the Casimir force in an arbitrary macroscopic configuration of metals and dielectrics.

Since 1975, a special multicritical point, the Lifshitz point, carries his name.

== Bibliography ==
- Belinskii, V. A.; Khalatnikov, I. M.; Lifshitz, E. M. (1970). "Oscillatory approach to a singular point in the relativistic cosmology". Advances in Physics. 19 (80): 525. Bibcode:1970AdPhy..19..525B. doi:10.1080/00018737000101171. The paper introducing the BKL conjecture.
- Landau, L. D.; Lifschitz, E. M. (1976). Mechanics. Course of Theoretical Physics. Vol. 1 (3rd ed.). London: Pergamon. ISBN 0-08-021022-8.
- Landau, L. D.; Lifschitz, E. M. (1971). Classical Theory of Fields. Course of Theoretical Physics. Vol. 2 (3rd ed.). London: Pergamon. ISBN 0-08-016019-0.
- Landau, L. D.; Lifschitz, E. M. (1977). Quantum Mechanics: Non-relativistic Theory. Course of Theoretical Physics. Vol. 3 (3rd ed.). London: Pergamon. ISBN 0-08-020940-8.
- Lifschitz, E. M.; Pitaevskii, L. P. (1981). Physical Kinetics. Course of Theoretical Physics. Vol. 10 (1st ed.). Oxford: Pergamon. ISBN 0-08-026480-8.
- Berestetskii, V. B.; Lifschitz, E. M.; Pitaevskii, L. P. (1982). Quantum Electrodynamics. Course of Theoretical Physics. Vol. 4 (2nd ed.). London: Pergamon. ISBN 0-08-026503-0.

Landau and Lifshitz suggested in the third volume of the Course of Theoretical Physics that the then-standard periodic table had a mistake in it, and that lutetium should be regarded as a d-block rather than an f-block element. Their suggestion was fully vindicated by later findings, and in 1988 was endorsed by a report of the International Union of Pure and Applied Chemistry (IUPAC).

== See also ==
- Landau–Lifshitz model
- Landau–Lifshitz–Gilbert equation
- Landau–Lifshitz pseudotensor
- Landau–Lifshitz aeroacoustic equation
- Belinski–Khalatnikov–Lifshitz singularity
- Lifshitz theory of van der Waals force
- Ferromagnetic resonance
- Premelting
