= Lev Landau =

Soviet theoretical physicist (1908–1968)

- Лев Ландау
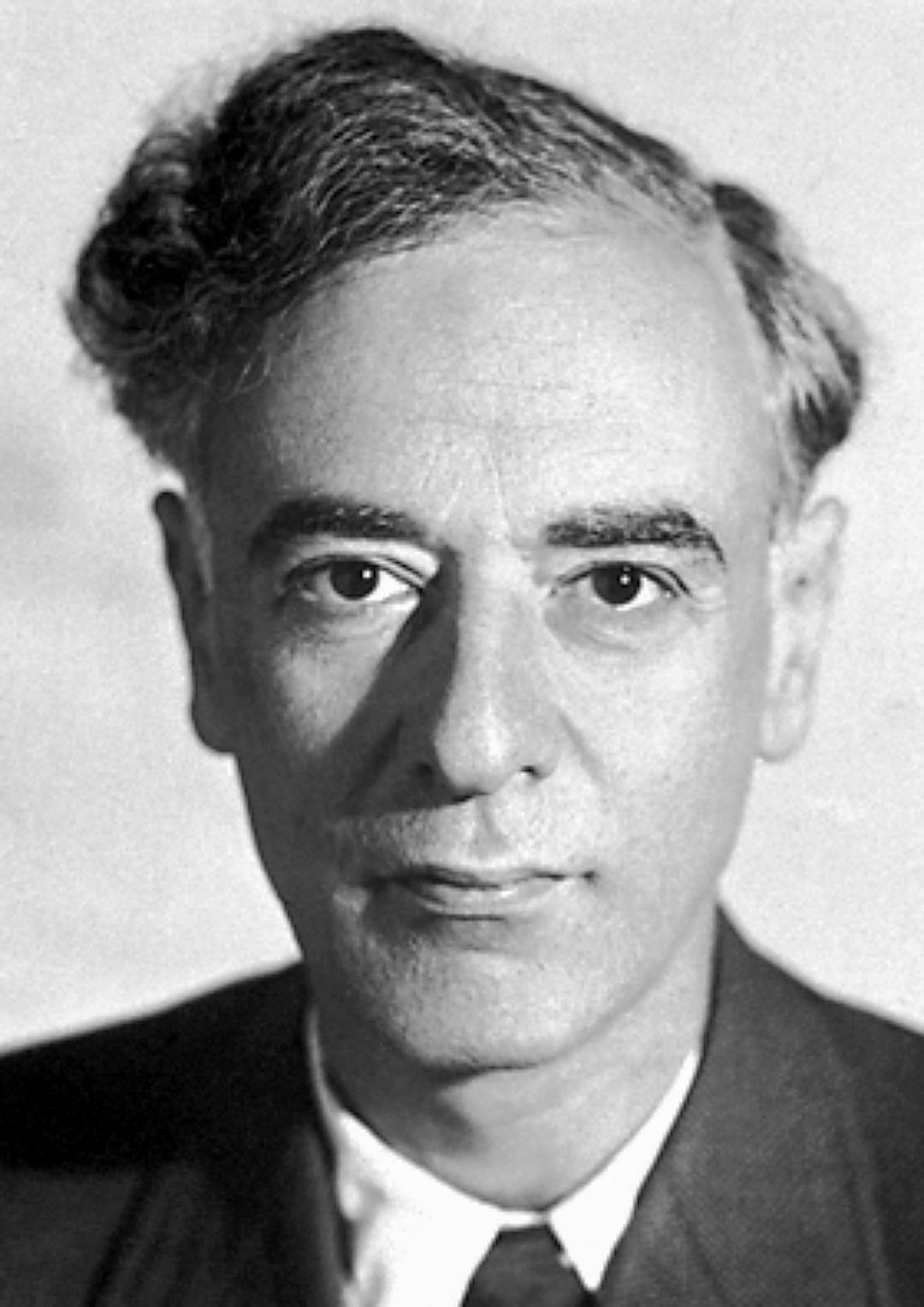
- Landau in 1962
- Born: Lev Davidovich Landau; 22 January 1908; Baku, Caucasus Viceroyalty, Russian Empire
- Died: 1 April 1968 (aged 60); Moscow, Soviet Union
- Resting place: Novodevichy Cemetery, Moscow
- Education: Baku State University; Leningrad State University (diploma, 1927); Leningrad Physico-Technical Institute (D.Sc., 1934)
- Known for: List: Landau damping; Landau distribution; Landau gauge; Landau pole; Landau susceptibility; Landau free energy; Landau levels; Landau's Fermi liquid theory; Landau's phase transition theory; Stuart–Landau equation; Ginzburg–Landau theory; Darrieus–Landau instability; Landau kinetic equation; Landau–Peierls instability; Landau singularities; Landau–Raychaudhuri equation; Landau–Zener formula; Landau–Squire jet; Landau–Levich problem; Landau–Pekar equations; Landau–Teller model; Landau–Lifshitz fluctuating hydrodynamics; Landau–Lifshitz model; Landau–Lifshitz pseudotensor; Landau–Lifshitz–Gilbert equation; Landau–Pomeranchuk–Migdal effect; Landau–Lifshitz force; Guderley–Landau–Stanyukovich problem; Landau–Placzek ratio; Landau–Yang theorem; Landau derivative; Ivanenko–Landau–Kähler equation; Landau–Lifshitz aeroacoustic equation; Landau principle; Landau–Hopf theory of turbulence; Density matrix; DLVO theory; Open quantum system; Polaron; Roton; Superfluidity; Superconductivity; Course of Theoretical Physics; Quantum hydrodynamics; Quasiparticle theory; Zero sound; Second sound; Antiferromagnetism; Two-fluid model
- Spouse: Kora Drobanzeva (m. 1937)
- Children: 1
- Awards: Stalin Prize (1946); Max Planck Medal (1960); Fritz London Memorial Prize (1960); Nobel Prize in Physics (1962)
- Scientific career
- Fields: Theoretical physics
- Workplaces: Kharkov Polytechnic Institute; Kharkov University; Institute for Physical Problems (RAS); MSU Faculty of Physics
- Academic advisors: Niels Bohr
- Doctoral students: Alexei Abrikosov; Aleksandr Akhiezer; Igor Dzyaloshinskii; Lev Gor'kov; Isaak Khalatnikov; Evgeny Lifshitz; Ilya Lifshitz; Isaak Pomeranchuk

Lev Davidovich Landau (Russian: Лев Дави́дович Ланда́у; 22 January 1908 – 1 April 1968) was a Soviet physicist who made fundamental contributions to many areas of theoretical physics. He was considered as one of the last scientists who were universally well-versed and made seminal contributions to all branches of physics. He is credited with laying the foundations of twentieth century condensed matter physics, and is also considered arguably the greatest Soviet theoretical physicist.

His accomplishments include the independent co-discovery of the density matrix method in quantum mechanics (alongside John von Neumann), the quantum mechanical theory of diamagnetism, the theory of superfluidity, the theory of second-order phase transitions, invention of order parameter technique, the Ginzburg–Landau theory of superconductivity, the theory of Fermi liquids, the explanation of Landau damping in plasma physics, the Landau pole in quantum electrodynamics, the two-component theory of neutrinos, and Landau's equations for S-matrix singularities. He received the 1962 Nobel Prize in Physics for his development of a mathematical theory of superfluidity that accounts for the properties of liquid helium II at a temperature below 2.17 K (−270.98 °C).

== Life ==
=== Early years ===
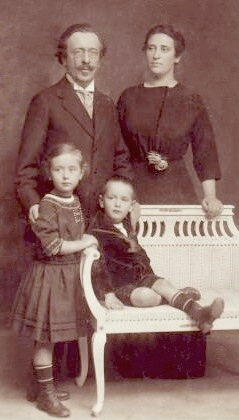
Landau family in 1910

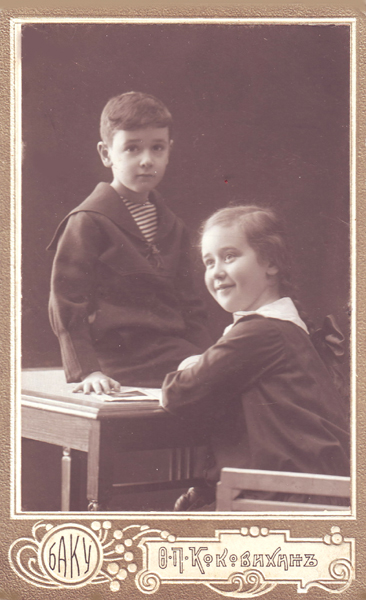
Young Landau in 1914

Landau was born on 22 January 1908 to Jewish parents in Baku, the Russian Empire, in what is now Azerbaijan. Landau's father, David Lvovich Landau, was an engineer with the local oil industry, and his mother, Lyubov Veniaminovna Garkavi-Landau, was a doctor. Both came to Baku from Mogilev and both graduated the Mogilev gymnasium. He learned differential calculus at age 12 and integral calculus at age 13. Landau graduated in 1920 at age 13 from gymnasium. His parents considered him too young to attend university, so for a year he attended the Baku Economical Technical School. In 1922, at age 14, he matriculated at the Baku State University, studying in two departments simultaneously: the Departments of Physics and Mathematics, and the Department of Chemistry. Subsequently, he ceased studying chemistry, but remained interested in the field throughout his life.

=== Leningrad and Europe ===
In 1924, he moved to the main centre of Soviet physics at the time: the Physics Department of Leningrad State University, where he dedicated himself to the study of theoretical physics, graduating in 1927. Landau subsequently enrolled for post-graduate studies at the Leningrad Physico-Technical Institute where he eventually received a doctorate in Physical and Mathematical Sciences in 1934. Landau got his first chance to travel abroad during the period 1929–1931, on a Soviet government travelling fellowship (People's Commissariat for Education) supplemented by a Rockefeller Foundation fellowship. By that time he was fluent in German and French and could communicate in English. He later improved his English and learned Danish.

After brief stays in Göttingen and Leipzig, he went to Copenhagen on 8 April 1930 to work at the Niels Bohr's Institute for Theoretical Physics. He stayed there until 3 May of the same year. After the visit, Landau always considered himself a pupil of Niels Bohr and Landau's approach to physics was greatly influenced by Bohr. After his stay in Copenhagen, he visited Cambridge (mid-1930), where he worked with Paul Dirac, Copenhagen (September to November 1930), and Zürich (December 1930 to January 1931), where he worked with Wolfgang Pauli. From Zürich Landau went back to Copenhagen for the third time and stayed there from 25 February until 19 March 1931 before returning to Leningrad the same year.

=== Ukrainian Physics and Technology Institute, Kharkov ===
Between 1932 and 1937, Landau headed the Department of Theoretical Physics at the Ukrainian Physics and Technology Institute (UPTI) in Kharkov, and he lectured at the University of Kharkov and the Kharkov Polytechnic Institute. Apart from his theoretical accomplishments, Landau was the principal founder of a great tradition of theoretical physics in Kharkov, Ukraine, sometimes referred to as the "Landau school". In Kharkov, he and his friend and former student, Evgeny Lifshitz, began writing the Course of Theoretical Physics, ten volumes that together span the whole of the subject and are still widely used as graduate-level physics texts. During the Great Purge, Landau was investigated within the UPTI Affair in Kharkov, but he managed to leave for Moscow to take up a new post.

Landau developed a famous comprehensive exam called the "Theoretical Minimum" which students were expected to pass before admission to the school. The exam covered all aspects of theoretical physics, and between 1934 and 1961 only 43 candidates passed, but those who did later became quite notable theoretical physicists.

In 1932, Landau computed the Chandrasekhar limit; however, he did not apply it to white dwarf stars.

=== Institute for Physical Problems, Moscow ===
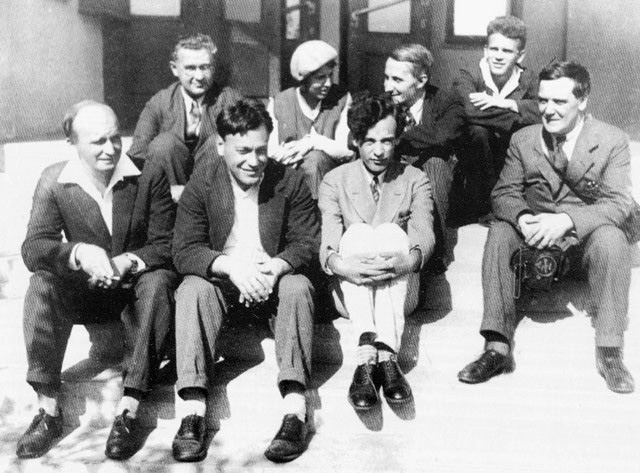
At the Kharkov Institute, 1934

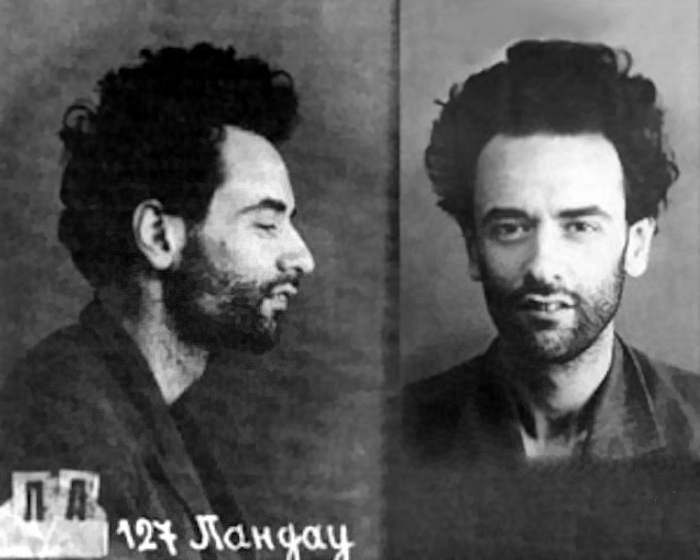
Photo in prison, 1938-1939

From 1937 until 1962, Landau was the head of the Theoretical Division at the Institute for Physical Problems.

On 27 April 1938, Landau was arrested for the possession of a leaflet which compared Stalinism to German Nazism and Italian Fascism. He was held in the NKVD's Lubyanka prison until his release, on 29 April 1939, after Pyotr Kapitsa (an experimental low-temperature physicist and the founder and head of the institute) and Bohr wrote letters to Joseph Stalin. Kapitsa personally vouched for Landau's behaviour and threatened to quit the institute if Landau was not released. After his release, Landau discovered how to explain Kapitsa's superfluidity using sound waves, or phonons, and a new excitation called a roton.

Landau led a team of mathematicians supporting Soviet atomic and hydrogen bomb development. He calculated the dynamics of the first Soviet thermonuclear bomb, including predicting the yield. For this work Landau received the Stalin Prize in 1949 and 1953, and was awarded the title "Hero of Socialist Labour" in 1954.

Landau's students included Lev Pitaevskii, Alexei Abrikosov, Aleksandr Akhiezer, Igor Dzyaloshinskii, Evgeny Lifshitz, Lev Gor'kov, Isaak Khalatnikov, Roald Sagdeev and Isaak Pomeranchuk.

=== Scientific achievements ===
Landau's accomplishments include the independent co-discovery of the density matrix method in quantum mechanics (alongside John von Neumann), the quantum mechanical theory of diamagnetism, the theory of superfluidity, the theory of second-order phase transitions, the Ginzburg–Landau theory of superconductivity, the theory of Fermi liquids, the explanation of Landau damping in plasma physics, the Landau pole in quantum electrodynamics, the two-component theory of neutrinos, the explanation of flame instability (the Darrieus–Landau instability), and Landau's equations for S matrix singularities.

Landau received the 1962 Nobel Prize in Physics for his development of a mathematical theory of superfluidity that accounts for the properties of liquid helium II at a temperature below 2.17 K (−270.98 °C)."

=== Personal life and views ===
In 1937, Landau married Kora T. Drobanzeva from Kharkov. Their son Igor (1946–2011) became a theoretical physicist. Lev Landau believed in "free love" rather than monogamy and encouraged his wife and his students to practise "free love". However, his wife was not enthusiastic.

Landau is generally described as an atheist by others, conversely when Soviet filmmaker Andrei Tarkovsky asked Landau whether he believed in the existence of God, Landau pondered the matter in silence for three minutes before responding, "I think so."

In 1957, a lengthy report to the CPSU Central Committee by the KGB recorded Landau's views on the 1956 Hungarian Uprising, Vladimir Lenin and what he termed "red fascism". Hendrik Casimir recalls him as a passionate communist, emboldened by his revolutionary ideology. Landau's drive in establishing Soviet science was in part due to his devotion to socialism. In 1935 he published a piece titled “Bourgeoisie and Contemporary Physics” in the Soviet newspaper Izvestia in which he criticized religious superstition and the dominance of capital, which he saw as bourgeois tendencies, citing “unprecedented opportunities for the development of physics in our country, provided by the Party and the government.”

=== Last years ===
On 7 January 1962, Landau's car collided with an oncoming truck. He was severely injured and spent two months in a coma. Although Landau recovered in many ways, his scientific creativity was destroyed, and he never returned fully to scientific work. His injuries prevented him from accepting the 1962 Nobel Prize in Physics in person.

Throughout his life Landau was known for his sharp humour, as illustrated by the following dialogue with a psychologist, Alexander Luria, who tried to test for possible brain damage while Landau was recovering from the car crash:

Luria: "Please draw me a circle"
Landau draws a cross
Luria: "Hm, now draw me a cross"
Landau draws a circle
Luria: "Landau, why don't you do what I ask?"
Landau: "If I did, you might come to think I've become mentally retarded".

In 1965 former students and co-workers of Landau founded the Landau Institute for Theoretical Physics, located in the town of Chernogolovka near Moscow, and led for the following three decades by Isaak Khalatnikov.

In June 1965, Lev Landau and Evsei Liberman published a letter in the New York Times, stating that as Soviet Jews they opposed U.S. intervention on behalf of the Student Struggle for Soviet Jewry. However, there are doubts that Landau authored this letter.

=== Death ===
Landau died on 1 April 1968, aged 60, from complications of the injuries sustained in the car accident six years earlier. He was buried at the Novodevichy Cemetery.

=== Rehabilitation ===
Landau was posthumously rehabilitated by the Soviet government in 1990, having remained throughout his life officially classified as having been "adequately exposed as a participant of the anti-Soviet group".

== Fields of contribution ==
- DLVO theory
- Fermi liquid theory
- Quasiparticle
- Ivanenko–Landau–Kähler equation
- Landau damping
- Landau distribution
- Landau gauge
- Landau kinetic equation
- Landau pole
- Landau susceptibility
- Landau potential
- Landau quantization
- Landau theory
- Landau–Squire jet
- Landau–Levich problem
- Landau–Hopf theory of turbulence
- Ginzburg–Landau theory
- Darrieus–Landau instability
- Landau–Lifshitz aeroacoustic equation
- Landau–Raychaudhuri equation
- Landau–Zener formula
- Landau–Lifshitz model
- Landau–Lifshitz pseudotensor
- Landau–Lifshitz–Gilbert equation
- Landau–Pomeranchuk–Migdal effect
- Landau–Yang theorem
- Landau principle
- Stuart–Landau equation
- Superfluidity
- Superconductivity

=== Pedagogy ===
- Course of Theoretical Physics

== Legacy ==
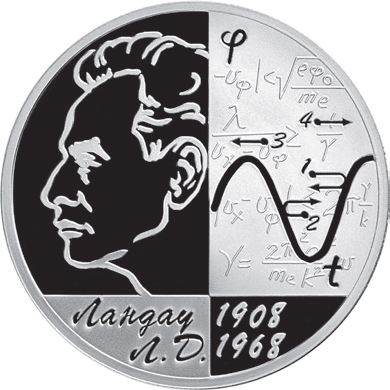
A commemorative Russian silver coin dedicated to the 100th anniversary of Landau's birth

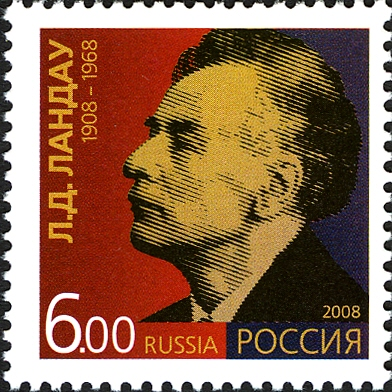
Landau on a 2008 Russian stamp

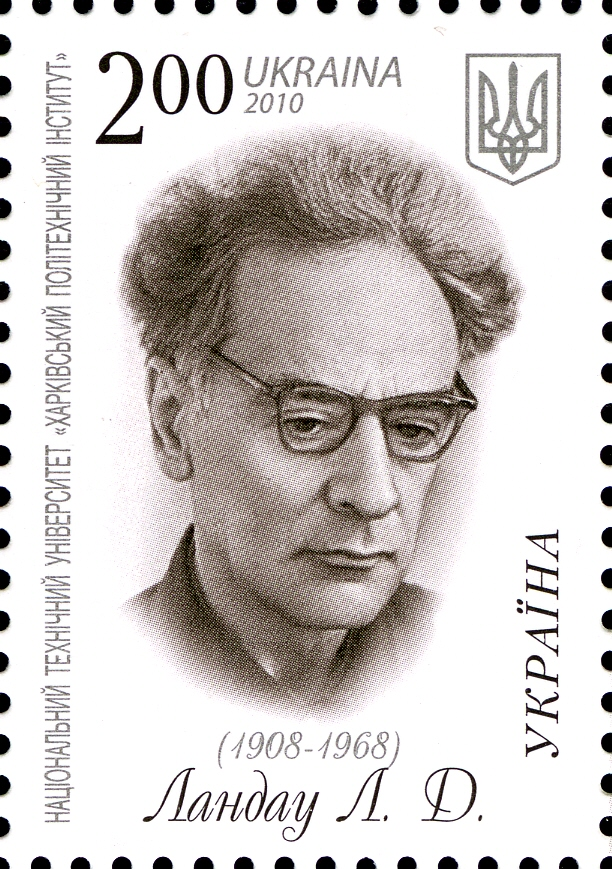
Landau in 1962 on a 2010 Ukrainian stamp

Two celestial objects are named in his honour:

- the minor planet 2142 Landau.
- the lunar crater Landau.

The highest prize in theoretical physics awarded by the Russian Academy of Sciences is named in his honour:

- Landau Gold Medal

On 22 January 2019, Google celebrated what would have been Landau's 111th birthday with a Google Doodle.

The Landau-Spitzer Award (American Physical Society), which recognizes outstanding contributions to plasma physics and European-United States collaboration, is named in-part in his honor.

== Landau's ranking of physicists ==
Landau kept a list of names of physicists which he ranked on a logarithmic scale of productivity and genius, such as creativity and innate talent, ranging from 0 to 5. The highest ranking, 0, was assigned to Isaac Newton. Albert Einstein was ranked 0.5. A rank of 1 was awarded to the founding fathers of quantum mechanics, Niels Bohr, Werner Heisenberg, Satyendra Nath Bose, Paul Dirac and Erwin Schrödinger, and others, while members of rank of 5 were deemed "pathologists". Landau ranked himself as a 2.5 but later promoted to a 2. N. David Mermin, writing about Landau, referred to the scale, and ranked himself in the fourth division, in the article "My Life with Landau: Homage of a 4.5 to a 2".

Landau had a lesser-known scale to measure the genius of a scientist using diagrams instead. He had four classes of diagrams, with the first being a simple triangle, which included those who were the most original and brilliant, such as Dirac and Einstein. The diagrams were formed by two parallel lines, bottom representing tenacity, while the top measured genius and originality.

== In popular culture ==
- Another film about Landau, Dau, is directed by Ilya Khrzhanovsky with non-professional actor Teodor Currentzis (an orchestra conductor) as Landau. Dau was a common nickname of Lev Landau. The film was part of the multidisciplinary art project DAU.

== Works ==
Landau wrote his first paper On the derivation of Klein–Fock equation, co-authored with Dmitri Ivanenko in 1926, when he was 18 years old. His last paper titled Fundamental problems appeared in 1960 in an edited version of tributes to Wolfgang Pauli. A complete list of Landau's works appeared in 1998 in the Russian journal Physics-Uspekhi. Landau would allow himself to be listed as a co-author of a journal article on two conditions: 1) he brought up the idea of the work, partly or entirely, and 2) he performed at least some calculations presented in the article. Consequently, he removed his name from numerous publications of his students where his contribution was less significant.

=== Course of Theoretical Physics ===
- L. D. Landau, E. M. Lifshitz (1976). Mechanics. Vol. 1 (3rd ed.). Butterworth–Heinemann. ISBN 978-0-7506-2896-9.
- L. D. Landau; E. M. Lifshitz (1975). The Classical Theory of Fields. Vol. 2 (4th ed.). Butterworth–Heinemann. ISBN 978-0-7506-2768-9.
- L. D. Landau; E. M. Lifshitz (1977). Quantum Mechanics: Non-Relativistic Theory. Vol. 3 (3rd ed.). Pergamon Press. ISBN 978-0-08-020940-1. — 2nd ed. (1965) at archive.org
- V. B. Berestetskii; E. M. Lifshitz; L. P. Pitaevskii (1982). Quantum Electrodynamics. Vol. 4 (2nd ed.). Butterworth–Heinemann. ISBN 978-0-7506-3371-0.
- L. D. Landau; E. M. Lifshitz (1980). Statistical Physics, Part 1. Vol. 5 (3rd ed.). Butterworth–Heinemann. ISBN 978-0-7506-3372-7.
- L. D. Landau; E. M. Lifshitz (1987). Fluid Mechanics. Vol. 6 (2nd ed.). Butterworth–Heinemann. ISBN 978-0-08-033933-7.
- L. D. Landau; E. M. Lifshitz (1986). Theory of Elasticity. Vol. 7 (3rd ed.). Butterworth–Heinemann. ISBN 978-0-7506-2633-0.
- L. D. Landau; E. M. Lifshitz; L. P. Pitaevskii (1984). Electrodynamics of Continuous Media. Vol. 8 (2nd ed.). Butterworth–Heinemann. ISBN 978-0-7506-2634-7.
- L. P. Pitaevskii; E. M. Lifshitz (1980). Statistical Physics, Part 2. Vol. 9 (1st ed.). Butterworth–Heinemann. ISBN 978-0-7506-2636-1.
- L. P. Pitaevskii; E. M. Lifshitz (1981). Physical Kinetics. Vol. 10 (1st ed.). Pergamon Press. ISBN 978-0-7506-2635-4.

Landau and Lifshitz suggested in the third volume of the Course of Theoretical Physics that the then-standard periodic table had a mistake in it, and that lutetium should be regarded as a d-block rather than an f-block element. Their suggestion was fully vindicated by later findings, and in 1988 was endorsed by a report of the International Union of Pure and Applied Chemistry (IUPAC).

=== Other ===
- L. D. Landau; A. S. Kompaneets (1965) [1935]. "Appendix A". The electrical conductivity of metals. ONTI, Kharkiv. pp. 803–832. doi:10.1016/B978-0-08-010586-4.50106-1. ISBN 9780080105864.
- L. D. Landau; Ya. Smorodinsky (2011) [1958]. Lectures on Nuclear Theory. Dover Publications. ISBN 978-0486675138.
- L. D. Landau; G. B. Rumer (2003) [1960]. What is Relativity?. Dover Publications. ISBN 978-0-48-616348-2.
- L. D. Landau; A. I. Akhiezer; E. M. Lifshitz (1967). General Physics, Mechanics and Molecular Physics. Pergamon Press. ISBN 978-0-08-009106-8.
- L. D. Landau; A. I. Kitaigorodsky (1978). Physics for Everyone. Mir Publishers Moscow. in 4 volumes: volume 1 Physical bodies ISBN 978-0-82-851716-4; volume 2 Molecules ISBN 978-0-82-851725-6; volume 3 Electrons and volume 4 Photons and nuclei; vols. 3 & 4 by Kitaigorodsky alone

== See also ==
- List of Jewish Nobel laureates
- List of things named after Lev Landau
