= Kharkiv Theoretical Physics School =

The Kharkiv Theoretical Physics School was founded by Lev Landau in Kharkov, Soviet Union (now Kharkiv, Ukraine) and further developed by Oleksandr Akhiezer and Ilya Lifshitz, following Landau's flight to the Kapitza’s Institute for Physical Problems in Moscow in 1937 in an attempt to avoid an arrest during the UPTI Affair.

It is sometimes referred to as the Landau school — more precisely, one might say that Landau's group at Kharkiv was the beginning of the Landau school. Lev Landau was the head of the Kharkhiv Theoretical Physics School from 1932 to 1937, His students at Kharkiv included Oleksandr Akhiezer, Evgeny Lifshitz, Ilya Lifshitz, and Isaak Pomeranchuk. Upon the recommendation of Edward Teller, László Tisza joined, in January 1935, Landau's group at Kharkiv and then returned to Budapest in 1937.

Landau developed a comprehensive exam called the "Theoretical Minimum" which students were expected to pass before admission to the school. The exam covered all aspects of theoretical physics, and between 1934–1937 in Kharkiv and 1937–1961 in Moscow only 43 candidates passed. In this way his students became proper physicists, rather than narrow specialists.

In Kharkiv, he and his friend and former student, Evgeny Lifshitz, began writing the Course of Theoretical Physics, ten volumes that together span the whole of the subject and are still widely used as graduate-level physics texts.

== Notable Achievements ==
Studies of light-light scattering by Oleksandr Akhiezer, Isaak Pomeranchuk and Lev Landau.

Akhiezer and Shulga worked on the development of quasi-classical theory of coherent radiation of channelled and over-barrier electrons and positrons in crystals. Ternovsky–Shulga–Fomin effect and Grinenko–Shulga mechanism have recently been confirmed experimentally by NA63 and UA9 experiments at CERN.

Dmitry Volkov, Vladimir Akulov and Vyacheslav Soroka played a crucial role in the development of Supergravity and Supersymmetry.

== Selected scientists associated with the school ==
- Lev Landau
- Aleksandr Akhiezer
- Ilya Mikhailovich Lifshitz
- Evgeny Lifshitz
- Mykola Shulga
