= Athletics at the 1979 Summer Universiade – Men's decathlon =

The men's decathlon event at the 1979 Summer Universiade was held at the Estadio Olimpico Universitario in Mexico City on 10 and 11 September 1979.

== Results ==
The highest mark recorded in each event is highlighted in yellow

Rank	Athlete	Nationality	100m	LJ	SP	HJ	400m	110m H	DT	PV	JT	1500m	Points	Notes
1st place, gold medalist(s)	Sepp Zeilbauer	Austria	10.99	7.39	16.12	2.09	49.52	14.31	43.28	4.60	62.24	4:51.2	8198	UR
2nd place, silver medalist(s)	Jürgen Hingsen	West Germany	11.15	7.67	14.04	2.13	48.95	14.32	40.92	4.40	56.18	4:42.2	8034	
3rd place, bronze medalist(s)	Hans-Dieter Antretter	West Germany	10.82	7.47	13.99	1.94	48.89	15.05	43.16	4.10	63.08	4:44.5	7868	
4	Wesley Herbst	United States	11.20	6.98	14.29	1.99	51.55	14.95	47.64	4.30	59.32	4:55.9	7656	
5	Vladimir Nemogayev	Soviet Union	10.82	7.03	14.82	1.91	49.47	14.64	37.70	4.60	58.66	5:86.6	7621	
6	Georg Werthner	Austria	11.21	7.20	13.59	1.85	50.35	15.13	38.36	4.70	68.66	4:51.7	7620	
7	Armin Tschenett	Switzerland	10.90	7.09	12.44	1.94	49.06	14.88	37.40	4.70	54.50	5:25.4	7394	
8	Erling Hansen	Denmark	11.60	7.02	12.77	1.88	51.77	15.28	41.48	4.30	48.74	4:50.8	7112	
9	Zenon Smiechowski	Canada	11.39	6.87	14.55	1.97	53.12	16.04	44.44	4.10	60.40	5:37.7	7109	
10	Karl Anker Jørgensen	Denmark	11.36	6.69	11.60	1.94	50.89	14.80	36.94	4.20	58.56	5:05.3	7092	
11	Robert Town	Canada	11.45	6.55	13.60	1.85	51.67	15.93	46.16	4.20	54.38	5:07.8	7058	
12	Yukihiro Minami	Mexico	??.?	?.??	??.??	?.??	??.?	??.?	??.??	?.??	??.??	?:??.?	6491	
13	Erasmo Garca	Mexico	??.?	?.??	??.??	?.??	??.?	??.?	??.??	?.??	??.??	?:??.?	–	5667
14	Sergio Catalán	Guatemala	??.?	?.??	??.??	?.??	??.?	??.?	??.??	?.??	??.??	?:??.?	5264	
	Tőnu Kaukis	Soviet Union	11.16	7.44	14.55	2.00	50.99	14.57	41.14	4.40	DNS	–	DNF	
	Gianni Modena	Italy	??.?	?.??	??.??	?.??	??.?	DNS	–	–	–	–	DNF	
	Brad McStravick	Great Britain	??.?	?.??	??.??	?.??	??.?	??.?	??.??	?.??	??.??	?:??.?	DNF	
	Konstantinos Kostis	Greece	??.?	?.??	??.??	?.??	??.?	??.?	??.??	?.??	??.??	?:??.?	DNF	
	Árpád Kiss	Hungary	??.?	?.??	??.??	?.??	??.?	??.?	??.??	?.??	??.??	?:??.?	DNF	
	Rigoberto Salazar	Cuba	??.?	?.??	??.??	?.??	??.?	??.?	??.??	?.??	??.??	?:??.?	DNF	
	Steve Jacobs	United States	??.?	?.??	??.??	?.??	??.?	??.?	??.??	?.??	??.??	?:??.?	DNF	
