= Athletics at the 1983 Summer Universiade – Men's decathlon =

The men's decathlon event at the 1983 Summer Universiade was held at the Commonwealth Stadium in Edmonton, Canada with the final on 9 and 10 July 1983.

== Results ==
The highest mark recorded in each event is highlighted in yellow

Rank	Athlete	Nationality	100m	LJ	SP	HJ	400m	110m H	DT	PV	JT	1500m	Points	Notes
1st place, gold medalist(s)	Dave Steen	Canada	11.26	7.61w	13.23	2.06	48.76	15.04	40.88	4.90	62.48	4:14.10	8205w	
2nd place, silver medalist(s)	Herbert Peter	West Germany	11.24	7.31w	11.71	2.06	48.18	14.90	43.70	4.50	65.68	4:05.05	8160w	
3rd place, bronze medalist(s)	Georg Werthner	Austria	11.42	7.01	14.20	1.97	49.44	15.18	38.76	4.70	67.94	4:21.48	7905	
4	Nikolay Poptsov	Soviet Union	11.30	7.10w	15.40	2.00	50.94	14.74	44.36	4.80	62.66	5:21.45	7749w	
5	Ahmed Mahour Bacha	Algeria	11.50	6.94	14.49	1.94	50.02	15.70	45.40	4.50	61.02	4:48.02	7608	
6	Renato Bortolocci	Brazil	11.03	6.30	14.01	2.12	50.55	15.23	41.16	4.50	53.02	5:07.32	7443	
7	Milan Popadich	Canada	11.13	6.94w	11.53	1.88	50.38	14.68	40.98	4.20	55.52	4:31.70	7418	
8	Weng Kangqiang	China	11.34	7.07w	12.27	1.91	51.20	15.60	38.22	4.70	63.34	4:56.68	7353	
9	Thomas Staubli	Switzerland	11.36	6.74	13.13	1.91	50.28	15.28	38.38	4.30	58.96	4:41.38	7349	
10	James Middleton	Australia	11.41	6.91	11.55	1.82	50.16	14.90	34.42	4.40	50.60	4:33.29	7123	
11	Fidelis Obikwu	Great Britain	11.62	6.89	14.14	2.00	50.78	16.21	34.38	4.10	55.72	DNF	6663	
12	Hatem Bachar	Tunisia	11.42	6.68	9.57	1.94	51.06	16.83	33.74	3.20	40.42	4:33.95	6328	
13	Ángel Díaz	Guatemala	11.67	6.32	8.05	1.97	52.98	16.20	24.74	3.00	44.84	4:35.70	5865	
14	Fattah Amhaz	Lebanon	11.69	5.55	9.66	1.79	55.25	16.43	21.98	3.30	38.02	5:29.99	5238	
	Orville Peterson	United States	11.02	7.52	14.30	2.15	49.78	14.76	35.98	NM	DNS	–	DNF	
	Sergey Pugach	Soviet Union	11.22	7.44	14.41	1.94	49.09	14.76	41.10	NM	DNS	–	DNF	
	Antonio Iacocca	Italy	11.55	6.66	12.90	1.88	?.??	–	–	–	–	–	DNF	
	David Zimmerman	United States	11.36	7.47	13.12	NM	DNS	–	–	–	–	–	DNF	
	Paulo Lima	Brazil	10.77	7.01	DNS	–	–	–	–	–	–	–	DNF	
	Liston Bochette	Puerto Rico	11.69	DNS	–	–	–	–	–	–	–	–	DNF	
	Fadi Ticaelian	Lebanon	11.43	DNS	–	–	–	–	–	–	–	–	DNF	
	Christian Gugler	Switzerland	?	–	–	–	–	–	–	–	–	–	DNF	
	Jens Schulze	West Germany	?	–	–	–	–	–	–	–	–	–	DNF	
