= Dmitry Volkov (physicist) =

Ukrainian scientist (1925–1996)

- Дмитро Васильович Волков, Дми́трий Васи́льевич Во́лков
- Born: 3 July 1925; Leningrad, Soviet Union (now Russian Federation)
- Died: 5 January 1996 (aged 70); Kharkiv, Ukraine
- Resting place: Kharkiv, Ukraine
- Citizenship: Soviet Union, Ukraine
- Education: Leningrad State University, Kharkiv State University
- Known for: supersymmetry, supergravity
- Awards: Honored Worker of Science and Technology of the Ukrainian SSR (1982), Walter Thirring Prize (1997)
- Scientific career
- Fields: Physics
- Workplaces: Kharkiv Institute of Physics and Technology
- Doctoral advisor: O. Akhiezer
- Notable students: Vyacheslav Soroka, Vladimir Akulov

Dmitry Volkov (Ukrainian: Дмитро Васильович Волков; 3 July 1925 – 5 January 1996) — physicist. PhD in 1956. Doctor of Physical and Mathematical Sciences (Habilitation) in 1968. Professor (1977). Academician of National Academy of Sciences of Ukraine (1988). Honored Scientist of the Ukrainian SSR (1982). Walter Thirring Prize 1997. Participant of World War II. Military and state awards. Founder of the scientific school on the theory of elementary particles.

== Scientific results ==
Volkov's scientific works concern issues of quantum field theory (scalar quantum electrodynamics, generalization of quantum statistics — parastatistics), the theory of Regge poles, the theory of higher symmetries and the problem of spontaneous vacuum transitions in dual models, the construction of the method of phenomenological Lagrangians in the theory of elementary particles and its applications in condensed matter physics. He constructed a generalized model that united the internal symmetry group of Goldstone particles with the group of Poincaré transformations. He proposed a new type of symmetry of elementary particles (bosons and fermions) — supersymmetry, which became the basis for building unified theories of fundamental interactions; and developed a local generalization of supersymmetry — supergravity. Proposed a twistor-like approach in the theory of superstrings and supermembranes, which occupies a key place in carrying out covariant quantization of these relativistic extended objects.

== Publications ==
Volkov has more than 150 publications on theoretical physics.
