= Athletics at the 1981 Summer Universiade – Men's decathlon =

The men's decathlon event at the 1981 Summer Universiade was held at the Stadionul Naţional in Bucharest on 23 and 24 July 1981.

== Results ==
The highest mark recorded in each event is highlighted in yellow

Rank	Athlete	Nationality	100m	LJ	SP	HJ	400m	110m H	DT	PV	JT	1500m	Points	Notes
1st place, gold medalist(s)	Aleksandr Shablenko	Soviet Union	11.08	7.10	15.21	2.04	49.44	15.06	48.60	4.70	51.04	4:29.66	8055	
2nd place, silver medalist(s)	Sergey Zhelanov	Soviet Union	11.43	7.23	13.46	2.16	49.55	14.94	42.12	4.80	55.90	4:23.35	8013	
3rd place, bronze medalist(s)	Georg Werthner	Austria	11.30	6.94	13.66	1.95	49.89	15.16	40.46	4.40	68.68	4:20.59	7825	
4	Marek Kubiszewski	Poland	11.23	6.84	13.95	2.01	49.07	14.94	40.78	4.20	63.78	4:27.94	7799	
5	Dave Steen	Canada	11.13	7.20	11.87	1.98	48.78	15.48	38.84	4.80	56.66	4:18.18	7784	
6	Petr Šarec	Czechoslovakia	10.99	7.12	13.75	1.95	48.50	14.82	42.46	4.30	44.48	4:24.67	7717	
7	Martin Machura	Czechoslovakia	11.09	7.14	14.45	2.01	49.80	16.61	43.40	4.50	53.62	4:47.19	7605	
8	Aurel Astileanu	Romania	11.17	697	11.44	2.01	50.40	15.56	35.82	4.40	50.42	4:20.09	7390	
9	Paulo Lima	Brazil	10.82	6.91	12.50	1.90	47.19	16.24	37.10	3.80	51.66	4:29.13	7347	
10	Weng Kangqiang	China	11.33	7.06	12.75	1.90	50.83	16.00	36.98	4.40	65.56	4:50.29	7319	
11	Philipp Eder	Austria	11.50	6.55	12.33	1.90	50.63	16.02	36.64	4.20	56.62	4:25.43	7142	
12	Dan Goia	Romania											6867	
	Gerardo Trujillano	Spain											DNF	
	Sandro Brogini	Italy											DNF	
	Thomas Staubli	Switzerland											DNF	
	Rigoberto Salazar	Cuba											DNF	
	Dannie Jackson	United States											DNF	
	Zezko Mitrakiev	Bulgaria											DNF	
	Jan-Erik Romar	Finland											DNF	
	Serge Morth	France	DNF										DNF	
