= Pomeranchuk instability =

The Pomeranchuk instability is an instability in the shape of the Fermi surface of a material with interacting fermions, causing Landau's Fermi liquid theory to break down. It occurs when a Landau parameter in Fermi liquid theory has a sufficiently negative value, causing deformations of the Fermi surface to be energetically favourable. It is named after the Soviet physicist Isaak Pomeranchuk.

== Introduction: Landau parameter for a Fermi liquid ==
In a Fermi liquid, renormalized single electron propagators (ignoring spin) are
$$G(K)=\frac{Z}{k_0 -\epsilon_{\vec{k}} + i\eta \sgn(k_0)}\text{,}$$
where capital momentum letters denote four-vectors $K=(k_0,\vec{k})$ and the Fermi surface has zero energy; poles of this function determine the quasiparticle energy-momentum dispersion relation. The four-point vertex function $\Gamma_{(K_3,K_4;K_1,K_2)}$ describes the diagram with two incoming electrons of momentum $K_1$ and $K_2$; two outgoing electrons of momentum $K_3$ and $K_4$; and amputated external lines:
$$\begin{align}
\Gamma_{(K_3, K_4 ; K_1, K_2)}&=\int{\prod_{i=1}^2{dX_i\,e^{iK_i X_i}}\prod_{i=3}^4{dX_i\,e^{-iK_i X_i}}\langle T\psi^{\dagger}(X_3)\psi^{\dagger}(X_4)\psi(X_1)\psi(X_2)\rangle} \\
&=(2\pi)^8 \delta(K_1-K_3)\delta(K_2-K_4) G(K_1) G(K_2) - {} \\
&\phantom{{}={}}(2\pi)^8 \delta(K_1-K_4)\delta(K_2-K_3) G(K_1) G(K_2) + {} \\
&\phantom{{}={}}(2\pi)^4 \delta({K_1+K_2-K_3-K_4}) G(K_1)G(K_2)G(K_3)G(K_4) i\Gamma_{(K_3, K_4 ; K_1, K_2)}\text{.}
\end{align}$$
Call the momentum transfer
$$K'=(k'_0,\vec{k'})=K_1-K_3\text{.}$$
When $K'$ is very small (the regime of interest here), the T-channel dominates the S- and U-channels. The Dyson equation then offers a simpler description of the four-point vertex function in terms of the 2-particle irreducible $\tilde{\Gamma}$, which corresponds to all diagrams connected after cutting two electron propagators:
$$\Gamma_{K_3, K_4; K_1, K_2} = \tilde\Gamma_{K_3, K_4; K_1, K_2} - i  \sum_Q \tilde\Gamma _ {K_3, Q+K';K_1,Q} G(Q)G(Q+K') \Gamma_{Q,K_4; Q+K', K_2}\text{.}$$
Solving for $\Gamma$ shows that, in the similar-momentum, similar-wavelength limit $k'\ll\omega'\ll1$, the former tends towards an operator $\Gamma_{K_1,K_2}^{\omega}$ satisfying
$$L=\Gamma^{-1}-(\Gamma^\omega)^{-1}\text{,}$$
where
$$L_{Q''+K'', Q'-K'; Q'', Q'} = -i\delta_{Q'',Q'}\delta_{K'',K'}G(Q')G(K'+Q')\text{.}$$
The normalized Landau parameter is defined in terms of $\Gamma_{K_1,K_2}^{\omega}$ as
$$f_{kk'} =  Z^2 N \Gamma^\omega ( (\epsilon_{\rm F}, \vec{k}) , (\epsilon_{\rm F}, \vec{k'}))\text{,}$$
where $N=\frac{p_{\mathrm{F}}m_{\mathrm{F}}^*}{\pi^2}$ is the density of Fermi surface states. In the Legendre eigenbasis $\{P_\ell\}_\ell$, the parameter $f$ admits the expansion
$$f_{p_{\rm F} \hat{k}, p_{\rm F} \hat{k'}} = \sum_{\ell=0}^{\infty}{P_\ell(\hat{k} \cdot \hat{k'})f_\ell}\text{.}$$
Pomeranchuk's analysis revealed that each $f_\ell$ cannot be very negative.

== Stability criterion ==
In a 3D isotropic Fermi liquid, consider small density fluctuations $\delta n_k=\Theta(|k|-p_{\mathrm{F}})-\Theta(|k|-p_{\mathrm{F}}'(\hat{k}))$ around the Fermi momentum $p_\mathrm{F}$, where the shift in Fermi surface expands in spherical harmonics as
$$p_{\rm F}'(\hat{k}) = \sum_{l=0}^\infty Y_{l,m}(\hat{k}) \delta \phi_{lm}\text{.}$$
The energy associated with a perturbation is approximated by the functional
$$E = \sum_{\vec{k}} \epsilon_{\vec{k}} \delta n_{\vec{k}} + \sum_{\vec{k},\vec{k'}}{ \frac{1}{2NV}f_{\vec{k}\vec{k'}} \delta n_{\vec{k}} \delta n_\vec{k'} }$$
where $\vec{\epsilon_k}=v_\mathrm{F}(|\vec{k}|-p_\mathrm{F})$. Assuming $|\delta\phi_{lm}|\ll|p_{\rm F}|$, these terms are,
$$\begin{align}
&\sum_{k} \epsilon_k \delta n_k = \frac{2}{( 2 \pi)^3}\int d^2 \hat{k} \int_{p_{\rm F}}^{p_{\rm F}'(\hat{k})} v_{\rm F} (p'-p_{\rm F}) p'^2 d p' = \frac{p_{\rm F}^2 v_{\rm F}}{(2 \pi)^3} \sum_{lm} (\delta \phi_{lm})^2 \frac{4 \pi}{2l+1} \frac{ (l+m)!}{(l-m)!} \\
&\sum_{k, k'} f_{k k'} \delta n_k \delta n_{k'} = \frac{2 p_{\rm F}^4}{(2\pi)^6 } \int d^2 \hat{k} d^2 \hat{k'} (p_{\rm F}'(\hat{k})-p_{\rm F})(p_{\rm F}'(\hat{k'})_{\rm F})f_{p_{\rm F} \hat{k}, p_{\rm F} \hat{k'}}
\end{align}$$
and so
$$E = \frac{p_{\rm F}^2 v_{\rm F}}{2 (\pi)^2} \sum_{lm} (\delta \phi_{lm})^2 \frac{(l+m)!}{(2l+1)(l-m)!}\left( 1+ \frac{f_l}{2l+1}\right)\text{.}$$

When the Pomeranchuk stability criterion
$$f_l >-(2l+1)$$
is satisfied, this value is positive, and the Fermi surface distortion $\delta\phi_{lm}$ requires energy to form. Otherwise, $\delta\phi_{lm}$ releases energy, and will grow without bound until the model breaks down. That process is known as Pomeranchuk instability.

In 2D, a similar analysis, with circular wave fluctuations $\propto e^{i l \theta}$ instead of spherical harmonics and Chebyshev polynomials instead of Legendre polynomials, shows the Pomeranchuk constraint to be $f_l > -1$. In anisotropic materials, the same qualitative result is true—for sufficiently negative Landau parameters, unstable fluctuations spontaneously destroy the Fermi surface.

The point at which $F_l = - (2l+1)$ is of much theoretical interest as it indicates a quantum phase transition from a Fermi liquid to a different state of matter Above zero temperature a quantum critical state exists.

=== Physical quantities with manifest Pomeranchuk criterion ===
Many physical quantities in Fermi liquid theory are simple expressions of components of Landau parameters. A few standard ones are listed here; they diverge or become unphysical beyond the quantum critical point.

Isothermal compressibility: $\kappa = -\frac{1}{V} \frac{\partial V}{\partial P} =\frac{N/n^2}{1+f_0}$

Effective mass: $m^* = \frac{p_{\rm F}}{v_{\rm F}} = m(1+f_1/3)$

Speed of first sound: $C = \sqrt{\frac{p_{\rm F}^2 (1+ f_0)}{m^2( 3+f_1)}}$

== Unstable zero sound modes ==
The Pomeranchuk instability manifests in the dispersion relation for the zeroth sound, which describes how the localized fluctuations of the momentum density function $\delta n_k$ propagate through space and time.

Just as the quasiparticle dispersion is given by the pole of the one-particle propagator, the zero sound dispersion relation is given by the pole of the T-channel of the vertex function $\Gamma(K_3, K_4; K_1, K_2)$ near small $K_1-K_3$. Physically, this describes the propagation of an electron hole pair, which is responsible for the fluctuations in $\delta n_k$.

From the relation $\Gamma= ((\Gamma^\omega)^{-1} - L)^{-1}$ and ignoring the contributions of $f_\ell$ for $\ell >0$, the zero sound spectrum is given by the four-vectors $K' = (\omega(\vec{k'}), \vec{k'})$ satisfying
$$\frac{Z^2 N}{f_0}  =-i \sum_Q G(Q+K')G(Q+K)\text{.}$$
Equivalently,

| $$\frac{-1}{f_0} = \Phi ( s,x) = \frac{(s-x/2)^2-1}{4x} \ln{\!\left(\frac{(s-x/2)+1}{(s-x/2)-1}\right)} -\frac{(s+x/2)^2 -1}{4x}\ln{\!\left(\frac{(s+x/2)+1}{(s+x/2)-1}\right)} +\frac{1}{2}$$ | 1 |

where $s = \frac{\omega(\vec{k})}{|\vec{k}|p_{\rm F}}$ and $x = \frac{|k|}{p_{\rm F}}$.

When $f_0>0$, the equation (1) can be implicitly solved for a real solution $s(x)$, corresponding to a real dispersion relation of oscillatory waves.

When $f_0<0$, the solution $s(x)$ is pure imaginary, corresponding to an exponential change in amplitude over time. For $-1<f_0<0$, the imaginary part $\Im(s(x))<0$, damping waves of zeroth sound. But for $-1 >f_0$ and sufficiently small $x$, the imaginary part $\Im(s(x))>0$, implying exponential growth of any low-momentum zero sound perturbation.

== Nematic phase transition ==
Pomeranchuk instabilities in non-relativistic systems at $l=1$ cannot exist. However, instabilities at $l=2$ have interesting solid state applications. From the form of spherical harmonics $Y_{2,m} (\theta, \phi)$ (or $e^{2i\theta}$ in 2D), the Fermi surface is distorted into an ellipsoid (or ellipse). Specifically, in 2D, the quadrupole moment order parameter
$$\tilde{Q}(q) = \sum_k e^{2i \theta_q} \psi^{\dagger}_{k+q} \psi_k$$
has nonzero vacuum expectation value in the $l=2$ Pomeranchuk instability. The Fermi surface has eccentricity $|\langle \tilde{Q}(0) \rangle|$ and spontaneous major axis orientation $\theta =\arg(\langle \tilde{Q}(0) \rangle)$. Gradual spatial variation in $\theta(\vec{r})$ forms gapless Goldstone modes, forming a nematic liquid statistically analogous to a liquid crystal. Oganesyan et al.'s analysis of a model interaction between quadrupole moments predicts damped zero sound fluctuations of the quadrupole moment condensate for waves oblique to the ellipse axes.

The 2d square tight-binding Hubbard Hamiltonian with next-to-nearest neighbour interaction has been found by Halboth and Metzner to display instability in susceptibility of d-wave fluctuations under renormalization group flow. Thus, the Pomeranchuk instability is suspected to explain the experimentally measured anisotropy in cuprate superconductors such as LSCO and YBCO.

== See also ==
- Kohn anomaly
- Pomeranchuk's theorem
- Lindhard theory
