= H. C. Ørsted Medal =

The H. C. Ørsted Medal is a medal for scientific achievement awarded by the Danish Society for the Dissemination of Natural Science (danish: Selskabet for naturlærens udbredelse). It is named after founder of the society Hans Christian Ørsted, and awarded chiefly to Danes.

== Medals ==
The medal is awarded in three versions:

- Gold "for excellent scientific work in the fields of physics and chemistry published in recent years"
- Silver "for excellent research dissemination of exact science to wider circles over a number of years"
- Bronze "for many years of excellent dissemination of exact science to wider circles through e.g. teaching, museum activities, arrangement of competitions, association activities or similar"

== Recipients ==
Source: Society for Dissemination of Natural Science

=== Gold ===
- 2024 Morten Meldal
- 2024 Jens Kehlet Nørskov
- 2020 Charles M. Marcus
- 2019 Karl Anker Jørgensen
- 1989 Thor A. Bak
- 1977 Kai Arne Jensen
- 1974 Jens Lindhard
- 1970 Christian Møller
- 1970 Aage Bohr
- 1965 Bengt Strömgren
- 1959 Jens Anton Christiansen
- 1959 Paul Bergsøe
- 1952 Alex Langseth
- 1941 Kaj Linderstrøm-Lang
- 1928 Peder Oluf Pedersen
- 1928 Niels Bjerrum
- 1928 Johannes Nicolaus Brønsted
- 1924 Niels Bohr
- 1916 Martin Knudsen
- 1912 Christian Christiansen
- 1909 S.P.L. Sørensen

=== Silver ===
- 2024 Henrik Stiesdal
- 2024 Andreas Mogensen
- 2022 Johan Gotthardt Olsen
- 2021 Samel Arslanagic
- 2020 Jens Ramskov
- 2019 Thomas Bolander
- 2016 Anja Cetti Andersen
- 2000 Jens Martin Knudsen
- 1999 Ove Nathan
- 1991 Niels Ove Lassen
- 1990 Jens J. Kjærgaard
- 1988 Niels Blædel
- 1980 K.G. Hansen

=== Bronze ===
- 2024 Gregers Mogensen
- 2024 Louise Ibsen
- 2023 Nicolai Bogø Stabell
- 2023 Per Saxtorph Jørgensen
- 2022 Lisbeth Tavs Gregersen
- 2022 Peter Blirup
- 2021 Anja Skaar Jacobsen
- 2021 Hans Emil Sølyst Hjerl
- 2020 Lasse Seidelin Bendtsen
- 2020 Claus Rintza
- 2020 Stefan Emil Lemser Eychenne
- 2020 Claus Rintza
- 2020 Lasse Seidelin Bendtsen
- 2019 Michael Lentfer Jensen
- 2019 Jeannette Overgaard Tejlmann Madsen
- 2018 Ole Bakander
- 2017 Bjarning Grøn
- 2016 Martin Frøhling Jensen
- 2015 Henrik Parbo
- 2014 Pia Halkjær Gommesen
- 2013 Niels Christian Hartling
- 2013 Peter Arnborg Videsen
- 2012 Jannik Johansen (scientist)
- 2006 Finn Berg Rasmussen
- 2004 Erik Schou Jensen
- 2003 Ryan Holm
- 2001 Asger Høeg

== See also ==
- List of chemistry awards
- List of physics awards
