= Kharkiv School =

Kharkiv School or Kharkov School may refer to:

== Educational institutions ==
- Kharkiv School of Photography
- Kharkiv Theoretical Physics School

== Academic groups and traditions ==
- Kharkiv Linguistic School
- Kharkov school of psychology
- Kharkiv Romantic School -- a poetic school
