= Charles M. Marcus =

American physicist (born 1962)

- Born: October 8, 1962 (age 63)
- Citizenship: United States
- Education: Stanford University (BS, Physics) Harvard University (PhD, Physics)
- Awards: Presidential Early Career Award for Scientists and Engineers (1996) Fellow of the American Association for the Advancement of Science (2013) H. C. Ørsted Gold Medal (2020)
- Scientific career
- Fields: Condensed matter physics
- Workplaces: Stanford University Harvard University Niels Bohr Institute University of Copenhagen University of Washington
- Thesis: Dynamics of Analog Neural Networks (1990)
- Doctoral advisor: Robert Westervelt

Charles Marcus (right) shows then-Secretary of State Antony Blinken (center) around his lab at the University of Copenhagen (2021).

Charles Masamed Marcus (born October 8, 1962) is an American physicist and professor. He currently works at the University of Washington and the Niels Bohr Institute, having previously worked at both Stanford and Harvard Universities. He was elected to the National Academy of Sciences in 2018 for his contributions to condensed matter and mesoscopic physics. He has also been recognized with the H. C. Ørsted Gold Medal for his contributions to quantum computing, spin qubits, and superconducting qubits. Other honors won by Marcus include fellowship in the American Physical Society and the American Association for the Advancement of Science, as well as election to the Royal Danish Academy of Sciences and Letters.

Marcus was born on October 8, 1962, in Pittsburgh, Pennsylvania, and grew up in Sonoma, California. He was the valedictorian of Sonoma Valley High School's class of 1980 and attended Stanford University, graduating with a Bachelor of Science degree in physics. He later received Master of Arts and Doctor of Philosophy degrees in physics from Harvard University under Robert Westervelt. His doctoral thesis, published in 1990, is entitled Dynamics of Analog Neural Networks.

In 1992, Marcus began working as an assistant professor at Stanford University. He was promoted to associate professor in 1999, but left the next year for a professor position at Harvard University. (Note: According to Stanford University, Marcus was a faculty member there until 2001, although this may be erroneous.) He worked there until 2012, when he moved to the Niels Bohr Institute at the University of Copenhagen to serve as Villum Kahn Rasmussen Professor. He continues to hold his professorship in Copenhagen, but since 2023 has served as professor and Boeing Johnson Endowed Chair at the University of Washington. Marcus stated that he was "excited to shepherd exchange between the UW and University of Copenhagen" as he continues to hold appointments at both institutions.
