= Pomeranchuk cooling =

Physical phenomenon

Pomeranchuk cooling is the phenomenon in which liquid helium-3 will cool if it is compressed isentropically when it is below 0.3 K. This occurs because helium-3 has the unusual property that its solid state can have a higher entropy than its liquid state. The effect was first observed by Yuri Anufriev in 1965. This can be used to construct a cryogenic cooler.

It is named after Isaak Pomeranchuk who predicted the phenomenon in 1950. This method was first used to obtain superfluid helium-3. Systems that use this technique are called Pomeranchuk cells.

In 2021 an analog effect has been observed on twisted bilayer graphene and in TMDs.
