= Henrik Stiesdal =

Danish inventor and businessman

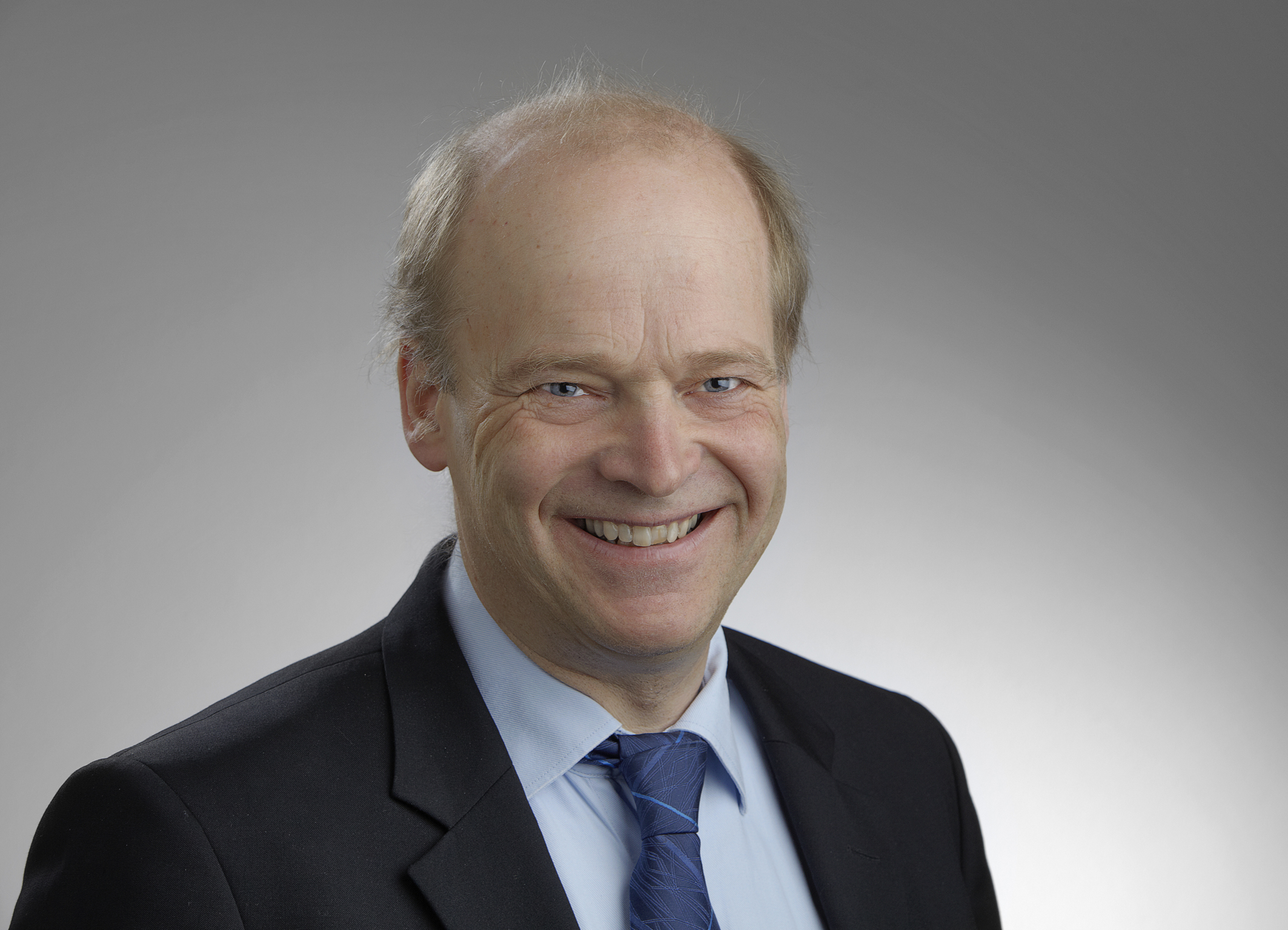
- Henrik Stiesdal, ex-CTO Siemens Windpower
- Born: Henrik Stiesdal; 14 April 1957; Hørsholm, Denmark
- Occupations: former chief technology officer, Siemens Wind Power
- Years active: 1978–present
- Awards: H.C. Ørsted Medal Silver (2024)
- Honours: Honorary Professor at Technical University of Denmark

Henrik Stiesdal (born 14 April 1957) is a Danish inventor and businessman in the modern wind power industry. In 1978, he designed one of the first wind turbines representing the so-called "Danish Concept" which dominated the global wind industry through the 1980s. Until 2014, Stiesdal was the chief technology officer of Siemens Wind Power. During his professional career, Stiesdal has made more than 175 inventions and has received more than 650 patents related to wind power technology. He is often known as the "Father of modern wind power".

== Early life ==
Henrik Stiesdal was born in Hørsholm, a town located in the East of Denmark. Between 1979 and 1988 he studied medicine, physics and biology at the University of Southern Denmark in Odense. In 1976, Stiesdal became motivated by the steam plume from a powerplant cooling tower in England to build two small test turbines out of wood, steel and fabric. He subsequently built a full-scale grid-connected wind turbine which was installed in 1978 on his parents' farm.

== Career ==
In 1978, Henrik Stiesdal designed (along with Karl Erik Jørgensen) one of the first wind turbines representing the so-called "Danish concept"; upwind, horizontal axis, three blades. In 1979, his design was licensed to Vestas A/S, a Danish manufacturer of farm wagons, truck cranes and ship coolers. Stiesdal's design formed the basis of this company's rise to become one of the leading wind turbine manufacturers. After first working for Vestas as a consultant, he joined the company in 1983 as project manager.

In 1987, Stiesdal joined the Danish wind turbine manufacturer Bonus Energy A/S as a development specialist. In 1988, he became a technical manager and in 2000 he took the role of Chief Technology Officer. In 2004, Bonus Energy A/S was acquired by the German technology company Siemens. Stiesdal became the Chief Technology Officer of Siemens Wind Power and remained in this position until the end of 2014, when he retired. According to rough calculations by Stiesdal, one person's work for a year at a wind turbine manufacturer or subcontractor compensates for 650 western peoples' CO_{2} emissions for that year. In 2016, he became affiliate professor at DTU Wind, the Technical University of Denmark´s Department of Wind Energy. He is now working on a startup that will produce massive tetrahedral structures that he designed that will serve as bases for floating wind turbines.

== Inventions and innovations ==
Stiesdal's initial work in the late 1970s and early 1980s contributed significantly to the development of the simple and robust technologies of the so-called Danish Concept, comprising upwind, automatic yawing and two-speed stall-regulated turbines with fail-safe safety systems. This concept is considered as the basis of the dominant position of the Danish wind industry through the following decades. In 1990, Stiesdal had overall responsibility for Vindeby Offshore Wind Farm, the world's first offshore wind farm, including the first offshore adaptation of wind turbines. The wind farm had 11 Bonus 450 kW turbines, and was installed in 1991. From 1995 onwards, Stiesdal was responsible for the development of the proprietary IntegralBlade® manufacturing technology. In this manufacturing process, blades are cast in one piece, eliminating weak spots of known technologies. In 1996, Stiesdal developed the CombiStall® blade regulation system which was fully implemented in the company's megawatt-range turbines. Two years later in 1998, Stiesdal designed the first variable-speed turbine for Bonus Energy A/S. The technology was tested commercially in 2002 and from 2005 onwards, it has been used in all of Siemens’ new products. From 1999 onwards, Stiesdal was in charge of the development of Siemens’ Direct Drive technology, eliminating the gearbox which is the classical weak spot of traditional wind turbine design.

Stiesdal is involved in around 175 inventions, including thermal storage, pyrolysis and other technologies, with an emphasis on simplicity and economy, rather than advanced technology. The TetraSpar floating platform for wind turbines, intended for industrialization, was installed with a standard 3.6 MW Siemens DD turbine at the first Hywind site in 2021.

== Rewards ==
- Siemens awarded Stiesdal as the Inventor of the Year in 2008 and as Top-Innovator in 2010.
- Henrik Stiesdal was awarded the Poul la Cour Prize of the European Wind Energy Association in 2011.
- In 2012, the trade magazine Windpower Monthly declared Henrik Stiesdal as the 2nd most influential person in the wind industry.
- In 2014 he received the German Renewables Award for Lifetime Achievements in Wind Energy.
- In 2015 he received the Wind Turbine Award from the Danish Wind Turbine Owners' Association.
- In 2019, the trade magazine Recharge gave its "Floating Wind Power Player of the Year" award to Stiesdal for his TetraSpar floating platform design for offshore wind turbines.
- In 2024 he was awarded the Queen Elizabeth Prize for Engineering, jointly with Andrew Garrad for their work on the development of high performance wind turbines.

== Private life ==
Henrik Stiesdal is married and has two daughters. He and his family live in Odense, Denmark.
