= Thomas Bolander =

Danish professor

- Education: Technical University of Denmark
- Awards: H. C. Ørsted Medal
- Scientific career
- Fields: Artificial intelligence
- Workplaces: Technical University of Denmark; DIS Copenhagen
- Website: www.imm.dtu.dk/~tobo

Thomas Bolander is a Danish professor at DTU Compute, Technical University of Denmark, where he studies logic and artificial intelligence. Most of his studies focus on the social aspect of artificial intelligence, and how we can make future AI able to navigate in social interactions. Thomas Bolander also sits in different commissions, expert panels and boards, among these he is a member of the Siri Commission, the TeckDK Commission, a member of the editorial board of the journal Studia Logica and co-organizer of Science and Cocktails.

Bolander is known for his dissemination of science. In 2019 he was awarded the H. C. Ørsted Medal. Which he was the first to achieve after a break of three years.
