= Lindhard theory =

Quantum theory of interacting electron gas

In condensed matter physics, Lindhard theory is a method of calculating the effects of electric field screening by electrons in a solid. It is based on quantum mechanics (first-order perturbation theory) and the random phase approximation. It is named after Danish physicist Jens Lindhard, who first developed the theory in 1954.

Thomas–Fermi screening, plasma oscillations and Friedel oscillations can be derived as a special case of the more general Lindhard formula. In particular, Thomas–Fermi screening is the limit of the Lindhard formula when the wavevector (the reciprocal of the length-scale of interest) is much smaller than the Fermi wavevector, i.e. the long-distance limit. The Lorentz–Drude expression for the plasma oscillations are recovered in the dynamic case (long wavelengths, finite frequency).

This article uses cgs-Gaussian units.

== Lindhard function ==
Static Lindhard function $F(x)$. Its derivative has a logarithmic divergence at $x=1$ (dashed line).

The term

$$\chi(\mathbf q,\omega)=\sum_{\mathbf k}\frac{f_{\mathbf{k+q}}-f_{\mathbf k}}{\hbar(\omega+i\delta)+E_{\mathbf k+q}-E_{\mathbf k}}$$

is a response function known as Lindhard function. Here $f_{\mathbf k}$ is the Fermi–Dirac distribution function for electrons in thermodynamic equilibrium, $E_\mathbf k=\hbar^2k^2/2m$ is the kinetic energy with wave vector $\mathbf k$, $m$ is the electron mass and $\delta$ is a positive infinitesimal constant,.

=== Zero temperature functions ===
At zero temperature, $f_{\mathbf k} (T=0)=\Theta(k_{\mathrm F}-|\mathbf k|)$ is a Heaviside step function, where $k_{\mathbf F}$ is the Fermi wave vector associated to the Fermi energy $E_{\mathrm F}=\hbar^2k_{\mathrm F}^2/2m$. The sum can be carried out in the continuous limit using analytic continuation, resulting in $\chi(\mathbf q,\omega)=\mathcal{F}(|\mathbf q|/2k_{\mathrm F},i\hbar (\omega+i\delta)/4E_{\mathrm F})$, where in 3 dimensions can be written as

$$\mathcal{F}(x,y)=\frac{1}{2}+\frac{1}{8x}\left[1-\left(x-\frac{y}{x}\right)^2\right]\log\left|\frac{x-y/x+1}{x-y/x-1}\right|+\frac{1}{8x}\left[1-\left(x+\frac{y}{x}\right)^2\right]\log\left|\frac{x+y/x+1}{x+y/x-1}\right|.$$

In the static limit, when $\omega\to0$, we have that $\chi(\mathbf q,0)=\mathcal{F}(|\mathbf q|/2k_{\mathrm F},0)=F(|\mathbf q|/2k_{\mathbf F})$, where

$$F(x)=\frac{1}{2}+\frac{1-x^2}{4x}\log\left|\frac{x+1}{x-1}\right|$$

is the (static) Lindhard function. This function derivative diverges at $x=1$. Also $F(x\to0)=1$. Note that $F(x)$ also appears in the calculation of the ground state energy of jellium when using Hartree–Fock method.

== Formula for the dielectric function ==
The electron-electron Coulomb potential $V (\mathbf r)=e^2/|\mathbf r|$, where e is the elementary charge, can be written in Fourier space as $V_\mathbf q=4\pi e^2/|\mathbf q|^2$ (where $\mathbf q$ is the wave vector), then the effective single particle potential is

$$V_{\mathrm{eff} } (\mathbf q)=\frac{V_{\mathbf q}}{\epsilon(\mathbf q)}.$$

The Lindhard formula for the longitudinal dielectric function is then given by

$$\epsilon(\mathbf{q},\omega)=1-V_{\mathbf q}\chi(\mathbf q,\omega),$$

where $\chi(\mathbf q, \omega)$ is Lindhard function.

This Lindhard formula is valid also for nonequilibrium distribution functions. It can be obtained by first-order perturbation theory and the random phase approximation (RPA).

To understand the Lindhard formula, consider some limiting cases in 2 and 3 dimensions. The 1-dimensional case is also considered in other ways.

=== Long wavelength limit ===
In the long wavelength limit ($\mathbf q\to0$), Lindhard function reduces to

$$\epsilon(\mathbf q=0,\omega)\approx 1 - \frac{\omega_{\rm pl}^2}{\omega^2},$$

where $\omega_{\rm pl}^2 = \frac{4 \pi e^2 N}{ L^3 m}$ is the three-dimensional plasma frequency (in SI units, replace the factor $4\pi$ by $1/\epsilon_{0}$.) For two-dimensional systems,

$$\omega_{\rm pl}^2(\mathbf q) = \frac{2 \pi e^2 n q}{\epsilon m}$$.

This result recovers the plasma oscillations from the classical dielectric function from Drude model and from quantum mechanical free electron model.

Derivation in 3D

For the denominator of the Lindhard formula, we get

$$E_{\mathbf k+\mathbf q} - E_{\mathbf k} = \frac{\hbar^2}{2m}(k^2+2\mathbf{k}\cdot\mathbf{q}+q^2) - \frac{\hbar^2 k^2}{2m} \simeq \frac{\hbar^2 \mathbf{k}\cdot\mathbf{q}}{m}$$,

and for the numerator of the Lindhard formula, we get

$$f_{\mathbf k+\mathbf q} - f_\mathbf k \simeq  \mathbf{q}\cdot\nabla_{\mathbf k} f_{\mathbf k}$$.

Inserting these into the Lindhard formula and taking the $\delta \to 0$ limit, we obtain

$$\begin{alignat}{2}
\epsilon(\mathbf q=0,\omega_0) & \simeq 1 + V_{\mathbf q} \sum_{\mathbf k,i}{ \frac{q_i \frac{\partial f_{\mathbf k}}{\partial k_i}}{\hbar \omega_0 - \frac{\hbar^2 \mathbf{k}\cdot\mathbf{q}}{m}} }\\
& \simeq 1 + \frac{V_{\mathbf q}}{\hbar \omega_0} \sum_{\mathbf k,i}{q_i \frac{\partial f_{\mathbf k}}{\partial k_i}}(1+\frac{\hbar \mathbf{k}\cdot\mathbf{q}}{m \omega_0})\\
& \simeq 1 + \frac{V_{\mathbf q}}{\hbar \omega_0} \sum_{\mathbf k,i}{q_i \frac{\partial f_{\mathbf k}}{\partial k_i}}\frac{\hbar \mathbf{k}\cdot\mathbf{q}}{m \omega_0}\\
& = 1 - V_{\mathbf q} \frac{q^2}{m \omega_0^2} \sum_{\mathbf k}{f_{\mathbf k}}\\
& = 1 - V_{\mathbf q} \frac{q^2 N}{m \omega_0^2} \\
& = 1 - \frac{4 \pi e^2}{\epsilon q^2 L^3} \frac{q^2 N}{m \omega_0^2} \\
& = 1 - \frac{\omega_{\rm pl}^2}{\omega_0^2}.
\end{alignat}$$,

where we used $E_{\mathbf k} = \hbar \omega_{\mathbf k}$ and $V_{\mathbf q} = \frac{4 \pi e^2}{\epsilon q^2 L^3}$.

Derivation in 2D

First, consider the long wavelength limit ($q\to0$).

For the denominator of the Lindhard formula,

$$E_{\mathbf k+\mathbf q} - E_{\mathbf k} = \frac{\hbar^2}{2m}(k^2+2\mathbf{k}\cdot\mathbf{q}+q^2) - \frac{\hbar^2 k^2}{2m} \simeq \frac{\hbar^2 \mathbf{k}\cdot\mathbf{q}}{m}$$,

and for the numerator,

$$f_{\mathbf k+\mathbf q} - f_{\mathbf k}  \simeq  \mathbf{q}\cdot\nabla_{\mathbf k} f_{\mathbf k}$$.

Inserting these into the Lindhard formula and taking the limit of $\delta \to 0$, we obtain

$$\begin{alignat}{2}
\epsilon(0,\omega) & \simeq 1 + V_{\mathbf q} \sum_{\mathbf k,i}{ \frac{q_i \frac{\partial f_{\mathbf k}}{\partial k_i}}{\hbar \omega_0 - \frac{\hbar^2 \mathbf{k}\cdot\mathbf{q}}{m}} }\\
& \simeq 1 + \frac{V_{\mathbf q}}{\hbar \omega_0} \sum_{\mathbf k,i}{q_i \frac{\partial f_{\mathbf k}}{\partial k_i}}(1+\frac{\hbar \mathbf{k}\cdot\mathbf{q}}{m \omega_0})\\
& \simeq 1 + \frac{V_{\mathbf q}}{\hbar \omega_0} \sum_{\mathbf k,i}{q_i \frac{\partial f_{\mathbf k}}{\partial k_i}}\frac{\hbar \mathbf{k}\cdot\mathbf{q}}{m \omega_0}\\
& = 1 + \frac{V_{\mathbf q}}{\hbar \omega_0} 2 \int d^2 k (\frac{L}{2 \pi})^2 \sum_{i,j}{q_i \frac{\partial f_{\mathbf k}}{\partial k_i}}\frac{\hbar k_j q_j}{m \omega_0}\\
& = 1 + \frac{V_{\mathbf q} L^2}{m \omega_0^2} 2 \int \frac{d^2 k}{(2 \pi)^2}  \sum_{i,j}{q_i q_j k_j \frac{\partial f_{\mathbf k}}{\partial k_i}}\\
& = 1 + \frac{V_{\mathbf q} L^2}{m \omega_0^2} \sum_{i,j}{ q_i q_j 2 \int \frac{d^2 k}{(2 \pi)^2} k_j \frac{\partial f_{\mathbf k}}{\partial k_i}}\\
& = 1 - \frac{V_{\mathbf q} L^2}{m \omega_0^2} \sum_{i,j}{ q_i q_j n \delta_{ij}}\\
& = 1 - \frac{2 \pi e^2}{\epsilon q L^2} \frac{L^2}{m \omega_0^2} q^2 n\\
& = 1 - \frac{\omega_{\rm pl}^2(\mathbf q)}{\omega_0^2},
\end{alignat}$$

where we used $E_{\mathbf k} = \hbar \epsilon_{\mathbf k}$, $V_{\mathbf q} = \frac{2 \pi e^2}{\epsilon q L^2}$ and $\omega_{\rm pl}^2(\mathbf q) = \frac{2 \pi e^2 n q}{\epsilon m}$.

=== Static limit ===
Consider the static limit ($\omega + i\delta \to 0$).

The Lindhard formula becomes

$$\epsilon(\mathbf q,\omega=0) = 1 - V_{\mathbf q} \sum_{\mathbf k}{\frac{f_{\mathbf k+\mathbf q}-f_{\mathbf k}}{E_{\mathbf k+\mathbf q}-E_{\mathbf k}}}$$.

Inserting the above equalities for the denominator and numerator, we obtain

$$\epsilon(\mathbf q,0) = 1 - V_{\mathbf q} \sum_{\mathbf k,i}{\frac{q_i \frac{\partial f}{\partial k_i} }{ \frac{\hbar^2 \mathbf{k}\cdot\mathbf{q}}{m} }}
= 1 - V_{\mathbf q} \sum_{\mathbf k,i}{\frac{q_i \frac{\partial f}{\partial k_i} }{\frac{\hbar^2 \mathbf{k}\cdot\mathbf{q}}{m} }}$$.

Assuming a thermal equilibrium Fermi–Dirac carrier distribution, we get

$$\sum_{i}{ q_i \frac{\partial f_{\mathbf k}}{\partial k_i} } = -\sum_{i}{ q_i \frac{\partial f_{\mathbf k}}{\partial \mu} \frac{\partial E_{\mathbf k}}{\partial k_i} } = -\sum_{i}{ q_i k_i \frac{\hbar^2}{m} \frac{\partial f_{\mathbf k}}{\partial \mu}}$$

here, we used $E_{\mathbf k} = \frac{\hbar^2 k^2}{2m}$ and $\frac{\partial E_{\mathbf k}}{\partial k_i} = \frac{\hbar^2 k_i}{m}$.

Therefore,

$$\begin{alignat}{2}
\epsilon(\mathbf q,0) & =
1 + V_{\mathbf q} \sum_{\mathbf k,i}{\frac{ q_i k_i \frac{\hbar^2}{m} \frac{\partial f_{\mathbf k}}{\partial \mu} }{\frac{\hbar^2 \mathbf{k}\cdot\mathbf{q}}{m} }} =
1 + V_{\mathbf q}\sum_{\mathbf k}{\frac{\partial f_{\mathbf k}}{\partial \mu}} =
1 + \frac{4 \pi e^2}{\epsilon q^2} \frac{\partial}{\partial \mu} \frac{1}{L^3} \sum_{\mathbf k}{f_{\mathbf k}} \\
& = 1 + \frac{4 \pi e^2}{\epsilon q^2} \frac{\partial}{\partial \mu} \frac{N}{L^3} =
1 + \frac{4 \pi e^2}{\epsilon q^2} \frac{\partial n}{\partial \mu} \equiv
1 + \frac{\kappa^2}{q^2}.
\end{alignat}$$

Here, $\kappa$ is the 3D screening wave number (3D inverse screening length) defined as

$\kappa = \sqrt{ \frac{4\pi e^2}{\epsilon} \frac{\partial n}{\partial \mu} }$.

Then, the 3D statically screened Coulomb potential is given by

$$V_{\rm s}(\mathbf q,\omega=0) \equiv \frac{V_{\mathbf q}}{\epsilon(\mathbf q,0)} = \frac {\frac{4 \pi e^2}{\epsilon q^2 L^3} }{ \frac{q^2 + \kappa^2}{q^2} }  = \frac{4 \pi e^2}{\epsilon L^3} \frac{1}{q^2 + \kappa^2}$$.

And the inverse Fourier transformation of this result gives

$$V_{\rm s}(r) = \sum_{\mathbf q}{ \frac{4\pi e^2}{ L^3 (q^2+\kappa^2)} e^{i \mathbf{q} \cdot \mathbf{r}} } = \frac{e^2}{ r} e^{-\kappa r}$$

known as the Yukawa potential. Note that in this Fourier transformation, which is basically a sum over all $\mathbf{q}$, we used the expression for small $|\mathbf{q}|$ for every value of $\mathbf{q}$ which is not correct.

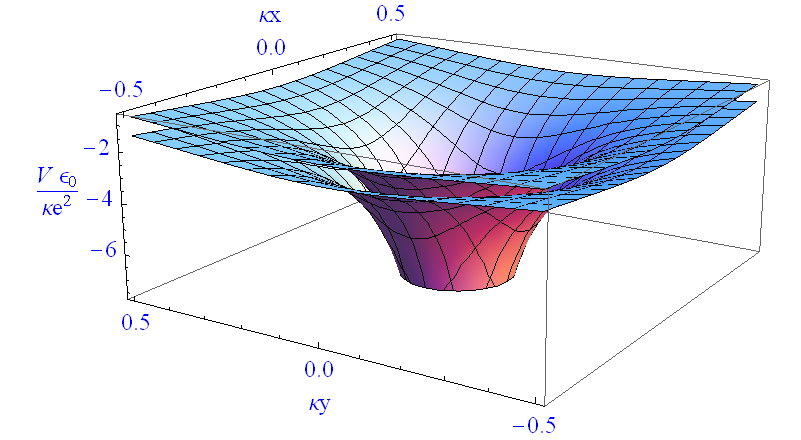
Statically screened potential(upper curved surface) and Coulomb potential(lower curved surface) in three dimensions

For a degenerated Fermi gas (T=0), the Fermi energy is given by

$$E_{\rm F} = \frac{\hbar^2}{2m}(3\pi^2 n)^{\frac{2}{3}}$$,

So the density is

$$n = \frac{1}{3\pi^2}  \left(\frac{2m}{\hbar^2} E_{\rm F}\right)^{\frac{3}{2}}$$.

At T=0, $E_{\rm F} \equiv \mu$, so $\frac{\partial n}{\partial \mu} = \frac{3}{2}\frac{n}{E_{\rm F}}$.

Inserting this into the above 3D screening wave number equation, we obtain

$\kappa = \sqrt{ \frac{4\pi e^2}{\epsilon} \frac{\partial n}{\partial \mu} } = \sqrt{ \frac{6\pi e^2 n}{\epsilon E_{\rm F}} }$.

This result recovers the 3D wave number from Thomas–Fermi screening.

For reference, Debye–Hückel screening describes the non-degenerate limit case. The result is $\kappa = \sqrt{ \frac{4\pi e^2 n \beta}{\epsilon} }$, known as the 3D Debye–Hückel screening wave number.

In two dimensions, the screening wave number is

$\kappa = \frac{2\pi e^2}{\epsilon}\frac{\partial n}{\partial \mu} = \frac{2\pi e^2}{\epsilon} \frac{m}{\hbar^2 \pi} (1-e^{-\hbar^2 \beta \pi n / m}) = \frac{2 m e^2}{ \hbar^2\epsilon} f_{k=0} .$

Note that this result is independent of n.

Derivation in 2D

Consider the static limit ($\omega + i\delta \to 0$). The Lindhard formula becomes

$$\epsilon(\mathbf q,0) = 1 - V_{\mathbf q} \sum_{\mathbf k}{\frac{f_{\mathbf k-\mathbf q}-f_{\mathbf k}}{E_{\mathbf k-\mathbf q}-E_{\mathbf k}}}$$.

Inserting the above equalities for the denominator and numerator, we obtain

$$\epsilon(\mathbf q,0) = 1 - V_{\mathbf q} \sum_{\mathbf k,i}{\frac{-q_i \frac{\partial f}{\partial k_i} }{ -\frac{\hbar^2 \mathbf{k}\cdot\mathbf{q}}{m} }}
= 1 - V_{\mathbf q} \sum_{\mathbf k,i}{\frac{q_i \frac{\partial f}{\partial k_i} }{\frac{\hbar^2 \mathbf{k}\cdot\mathbf{q}}{m} }}$$.

Assuming a thermal equilibrium Fermi–Dirac carrier distribution, we get

$$\sum_{i}{ q_i \frac{\partial f_{\mathbf k}}{\partial k_i} } = -\sum_{i}{ q_i \frac{\partial f_{\mathbf k}}{\partial \mu} \frac{\partial E_{\mathbf k}}{\partial k_i} } = -\sum_{i}{ q_i k_i \frac{\hbar^2}{m} \frac{\partial f_{\mathbf k}}{\partial \mu}}$$.

Therefore,

$$\begin{alignat}{2}
\epsilon(\mathbf q,0) & =
1 + V_{\mathbf q} \sum_{\mathbf k,i}{\frac{ q_i k_i \frac{\hbar^2}{m} \frac{\partial f_{\mathbf k}}{\partial \mu} }{\frac{\hbar^2 \mathbf{k}\cdot\mathbf{q}}{m} }} =
1 + V_{\mathbf q}\sum_{\mathbf k}{\frac{\partial f_{\mathbf k}}{\partial \mu}} =
1 + \frac{2 \pi e^2}{\epsilon q L^2} \frac{\partial}{\partial \mu} \sum_{\mathbf k}{f_{\mathbf k}} \\
& = 1 + \frac{2 \pi e^2}{\epsilon q} \frac{\partial}{\partial \mu} \frac{N}{L^2} =
1 + \frac{2 \pi e^2}{\epsilon q} \frac{\partial n}{\partial \mu} \equiv
1 + \frac{\kappa}{q}.
\end{alignat}$$

$\kappa$ is 2D screening wave number(2D inverse screening length) defined as

$\kappa = \frac{2\pi e^2}{\epsilon} \frac{\partial n}{\partial \mu}$.

Then, the 2D statically screened Coulomb potential is given by

$$V_{\rm s}(\mathbf q,\omega=0) \equiv \frac{V_{\mathbf q}}{\epsilon(\mathbf q,0)} = \frac{2 \pi e^2}{\epsilon q L^2} \frac{q}{q + \kappa} = \frac{2 \pi e^2}{\epsilon L^2} \frac{1}{q + \kappa}$$.

It is known that the chemical potential of the 2-dimensional Fermi gas is given by

$$\mu (n,T) = \frac{1}{\beta} \ln{(e^{\hbar^2 \beta \pi n/m}-1)}$$,

and $\frac{\partial \mu}{\partial n} = \frac{\hbar^2 \pi}{m} \frac{1}{1-e^{-\hbar^2 \beta \pi n / m}}$.

== Formula for the magnetic susceptibility ==
As with the dielectric function, the magnetic susceptibility $\chi_{\mathbf M}$ for an electron gas can be calculated as

$$\chi_{\mathrm M}(\mathbf{q},\omega)=2\mu_{\mathrm B}^2\chi(\mathbf q, \omega)$$

where $\mu_{\mathrm B}$ is the Bohr magneton.

In the static limit,

$$\chi_{\mathrm M}(\mathbf{q},\omega)\approx 2\mu_{\mathrm B}^2\int_{|\mathbf k|<k_{\mathrm F}} \left(\frac{\partial f_{\mathbf k}}{\partial E_{\mathbf k}}\right)d^3k=\mu_{\mathrm B}^2\frac{mk_{\mathrm F}}{\pi},$$

which corresponds to the spin susceptibility of Pauli paramagnetism.

== Screening experiments on one dimensional systems ==
This time, consider some generalized case for lowering the dimension. The lower the dimension is, the weaker the screening effect. In lower dimension, some of the field lines pass through the barrier material wherein the screening has no effect. For the 1-dimensional case, we can guess that the screening affects only the field lines which are very close to the wire axis.

In real experiment, we should also take the 3D bulk screening effect into account even though we deal with 1D case like the single filament. The Thomas–Fermi screening has been applied to an electron gas confined to a filament and a coaxial cylinder. For a K_{2}Pt(CN)_{4}Cl_{0.32}·2.6H_{2}0 filament, it was found that the potential within the region between the filament and cylinder varies as $e^{-k_{\rm eff}r}/r$ and its effective screening length is about 10 times that of metallic platinum.

== See also ==
- Kohn anomaly
- Pomeranchuk instability
- Bardeen–Pines interaction
