= Athletics at the 1977 Summer Universiade – Men's decathlon =

The men's decathlon event at the 1977 Summer Universiade was held at the Vasil Levski National Stadium in Sofia on 21 and 22 August.

== Results ==
The highest mark recorded in each event is highlighted in yellow

Rank	Athlete	Nationality	100m	LJ	SP	HJ	400m	110m H	DT	PV	JT	1500m	Points	Notes
1st place, gold medalist(s)	Sepp Zeilbauer	Austria	11.01	7.17	14.74	2.01	48.84	14.35	43.52	4.70	62.08	4:43.7	8097	
2nd place, silver medalist(s)	Valeriy Kachanov	Soviet Union	11.04	7.38	13.61	2.07	47.91	14.61	42.68	4.10	54.64	4:30.0	7958	
3rd place, bronze medalist(s)	Rumen Petrov	Bulgaria	11.42	7.07	15.27	2.07	49.20	15.54	48.24	4.40	59.28	4:35.5	7949	
4	Atanas Andonov	Bulgaria	11.19	7.01	13.69	2.04	49.36	14.70w	44.20	4.60	57.00	4:39.1	7872	
5	Rudolf Brumund	West Germany	11.17	6.86	13.87	1.98	47.68	15.11w	39.14	4.10	59.80	4:27.4	7731	
6	Arpad Kiss	Hungary	11.11	6.96	14.34	1.98	49.30	14.80w	44.26	4.40	52.76	4:48.4	7705	
7	Craig Brigham	United States	11.39	6.64	14.73	1.90	50.33	15.62	45.32	4.60	57.16	4:39.8	7568	
8	Ivan Spalovsky	Czechoslovakia	11.53	6.98	13.06	1.90	50.50	15.03w	42.20	4.40	59.74	4:31.1	7540	
9	Serge Morth	France	10.89	7.29	14.11	1.95	50.83	14.91	41.30	4.70	45.92	5:12.4	7497	
10	Pyotr Klimov	Soviet Union	11.16	6.95	13.60	1.85	48.57	14.97	40.58	4.20	51.50	4:49.8	7401	
11	Norbert Hoischen	West Germany	11.38	6.58	13.56	1.98	50.31	15.41	40.62	4.00	64.76	4:52.0	7361	
12	Eltjo Schutter	Netherlands	11.26	7.00	12.04	1.85	49.69	15.17w	37.88	4.40	48.20	4:35.4	7253	
13	Rene Wyttenbach	Switzerland	11.34	7.03	10.88	1.90	50.02	15.05	34.24	4.00	49.80	4:30.2	7082	
	Philippe Bobin	France	11.07	7.56	13.83	1.98	50.11	DNS	–	–	–	–	DNF	
	Rigoberto Salazar	Cuba	11.26	6.89	13.79	?.??	??.??	??.??	–	–	–	–	DNF	
	Jaromir Frič	Czechoslovakia	11.34	6.92	11.39	?.??	??.??	??.??	–	–	–	–	DNF	
	Steve Alexander	United States	11.44	6.48	??.??	?.??	??.??	??.??	–	–	–	–	DNF	
