= Athletics at the 1975 Pan American Games – Men's decathlon =

Men's decathlon at the Pan American Games

The men's decathlon event at the 1975 Pan American Games was held in Mexico City on 18 and 19 October.

== Results ==
The highest mark recorded in each event is highlighted in yellow

| Rank | Athlete | Nationality | 100m | LJ | SP | HJ | 400m | 110m H | DT | PV | JT | 1500m | Points | Notes |
|---|---|---|---|---|---|---|---|---|---|---|---|---|---|---|
| 1st place, gold medalist(s) | Bruce Jenner | United States | 11.09 | 7.00 | 15.23 | 1.97 | 49.12 | 14.95 | 47.93 | 4.60 | 63.99 | 4:42.86 | 8045 | GR |
| 2nd place, silver medalist(s) | Fred Dixon | United States | 10.80 | 7.31 | 14.74 | 1.93 | 47.82 | 14.71 | 46.43 | 4.20 | 65.59 | 4:55.91 | 8019 | |
| 3rd place, bronze medalist(s) | Jesús Mirabal | Cuba | 10.53 | 6.96 | 14.29 | 1.85 | 49.20 | 14.23 | 38.37 | 4.30 | 63.11 | 5:29.33 | 7582 | |
| 4 | Tito Steiner | Argentina | 11.06 | 7.34 | 14.46 | 1.91 | 48.98 | 14.77 | 38.96 | 3.80 | 55.60 | 4:42.78 | 7572 | |
| 5 | Alfredo Silva | Chile | 11.31 | 6.80 | 11.98 | 2.00 | 51.33 | 15.49 | 33.76 | 3.60 | 49.80 | 4:55.54 | 6831 | |
| 6 | Elpidio Encarnación | Dominican Republic | 11.39 | 6.19 | 11.83 | 1.81 | 50.00 | 15.51 | 40.37 | 3.25 | 58.67 | 4:56.66 | 6701 | |
| | Rafael Echavarría | Mexico | 11.43 | 6.61 | 10.56 | 1.91 | 49.28 | 15.24 | 32.18 | 3.60 | ? | DNS | DNF | |
| | Rigoberto Salazar | Cuba | 11.01 | 7.00 | 13.35 | 1.93 | DNS | – | – | – | – | – | DNF | |
