= Kohn anomaly =

Quantum anomaly

A Kohn anomaly or the Kohn effect is an anomaly in the dispersion relation of a phonon branch in a metal. The anomaly is named for Walter Kohn, who first proposed it in 1959.

== Description ==
In condensed matter physics, a Kohn anomaly (also called the Kohn effect) is an anomaly in the dispersion relation of a phonon branch in a metal.

For a specific wavevector, the frequency (and thus the energy) of the associated phonon is considerably lowered, and there is a discontinuity in its derivative. In extreme cases (that can happen in low-dimensional materials), the energy of this phonon is zero, meaning that a static distortion of the lattice appears. This is one explanation for charge density waves in solids. The wavevectors at which a Kohn anomaly is possible are the nesting vectors of the Fermi surface, that is vectors that connect a lot of points of the Fermi surface (for a one-dimensional chain of atoms or a spherical Fermi surface this vector would be $2k_{\rm F}$). The electron phonon interaction causes a rigid shift of the Fermi sphere and a failure of the Born-Oppenheimer approximation since the electrons do not follow any more the ionic motion adiabatically.

In the phonon spectrum of a metal, a Kohn anomaly is a discontinuity in the derivative of the dispersion relation that is produced by the abrupt change in the screening of lattice vibrations by conduction electrons. It can occur at any point in the Brillouin Zone because $2k_{\rm F}$) is unrelated to crystal symmetry. In one dimension, it is equivalent to a Peierls instability, and it is similar to the Jahn-Teller effect seen in molecular systems.

Kohn anomalies arise together with Friedel oscillations when one considers the Lindhard theory instead of the Thomas–Fermi approximation in order to find an expression for the dielectric function of a homogeneous electron gas. The expression for the real part $\operatorname{Re}(\varepsilon (\mathbf{q}, \omega))$ of the reciprocal space dielectric function obtained following the Lindhard theory includes a logarithmic term that is singular at $\mathbf{q} = 2\mathbf{k}_{\rm F}$, where $\mathbf{k}_{\rm F}$ is the Fermi wavevector. Although this singularity is quite small in reciprocal space, if one takes the Fourier transform and passes into real space, the Gibbs phenomenon causes a strong oscillation of $\operatorname{Re}(\varepsilon (\mathbf{r}, \omega))$ in the proximity of the singularity mentioned above. In the context of phonon dispersion relations, these oscillations appear as a vertical tangent in the plot of $\omega ^2(\mathbf{q})$, called the Kohn anomalies.

Many different systems exhibit Kohn anomalies, including graphene, bulk metals, and many low-dimensional systems (the reason involves the condition $\mathbf{q} = 2 \mathbf{k}_{\rm F}$, which depends on the topology of the Fermi surface). However, it is important to emphasize that only materials showing metallic behaviour can exhibit a Kohn anomaly, since the model emerges from a homogeneous electron gas approximation.

== History ==
The anomaly is named for Walter Kohn. They have been first proposed by Walter Kohn in 1959.

== See also ==
- Zero sound
- Pomeranchuk instability
