= Walter Kohn =

American physicist (1923–2016)

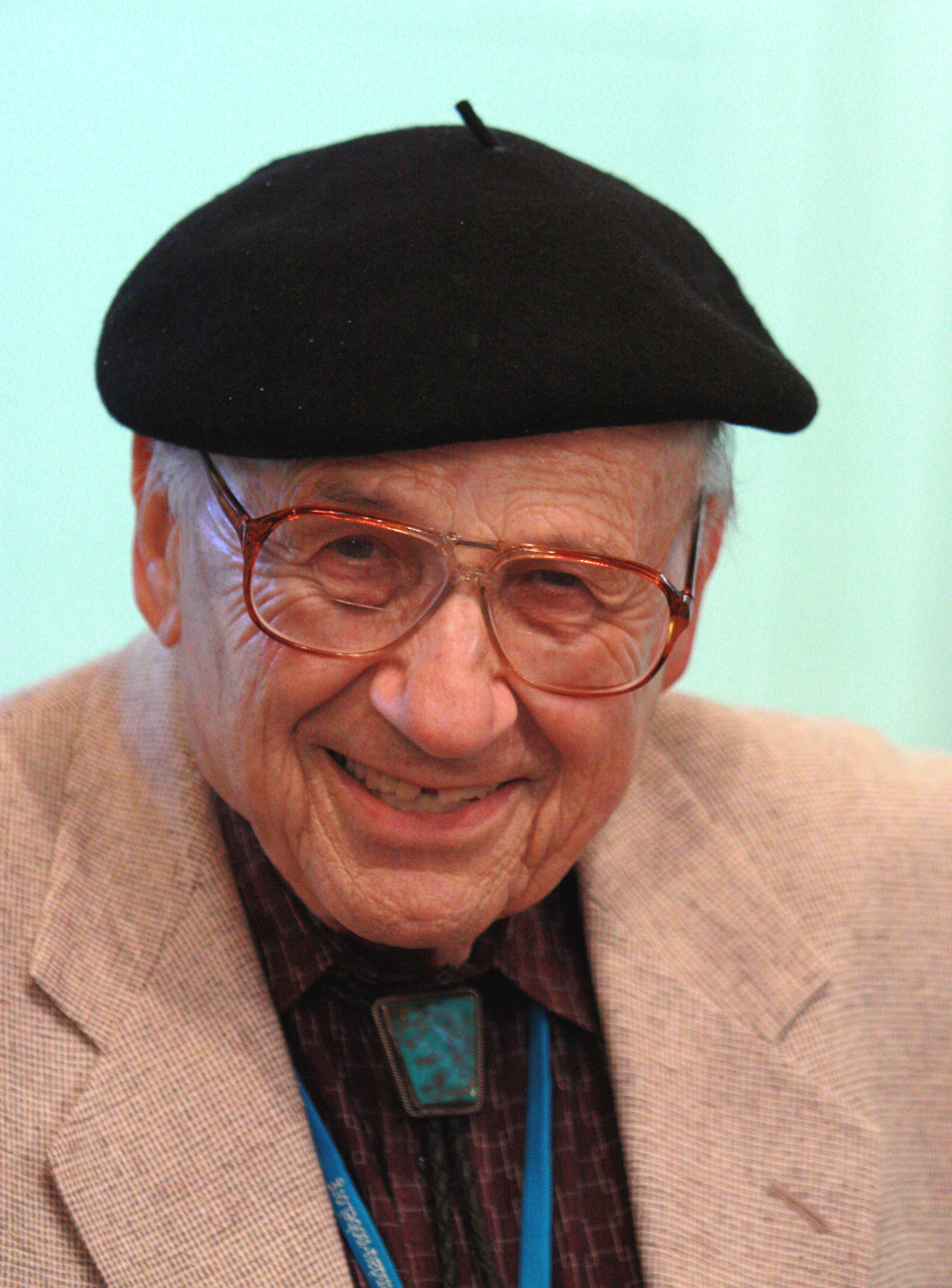
- Kohn in 2012
- Born: March 9, 1923; Vienna, Austria
- Died: April 19, 2016 (aged 93); Santa Barbara, California, U.S.
- Education: University of Toronto (BA, MA); Harvard University (PhD)
- Known for: Density functional theory Luttinger-Kohn model Hohenberg-Kohn theorems Kohn-Sham equations KKR method Kohn anomaly Kohn effect Kohn–Luttinger superconductivity
- Spouse(s): Lois (Adams) († 2010); Mara (Vishniac) Schiff († 2018)
- Awards: Oliver E. Buckley Prize (1961); National Medal of Science (1988); Nobel Prize in Chemistry (1998)
- Scientific career
- Fields: Physics, Chemistry
- Workplaces: Carnegie Mellon University, UC Santa Barbara, UC San Diego
- Doctoral advisor: Julian Schwinger

Signature
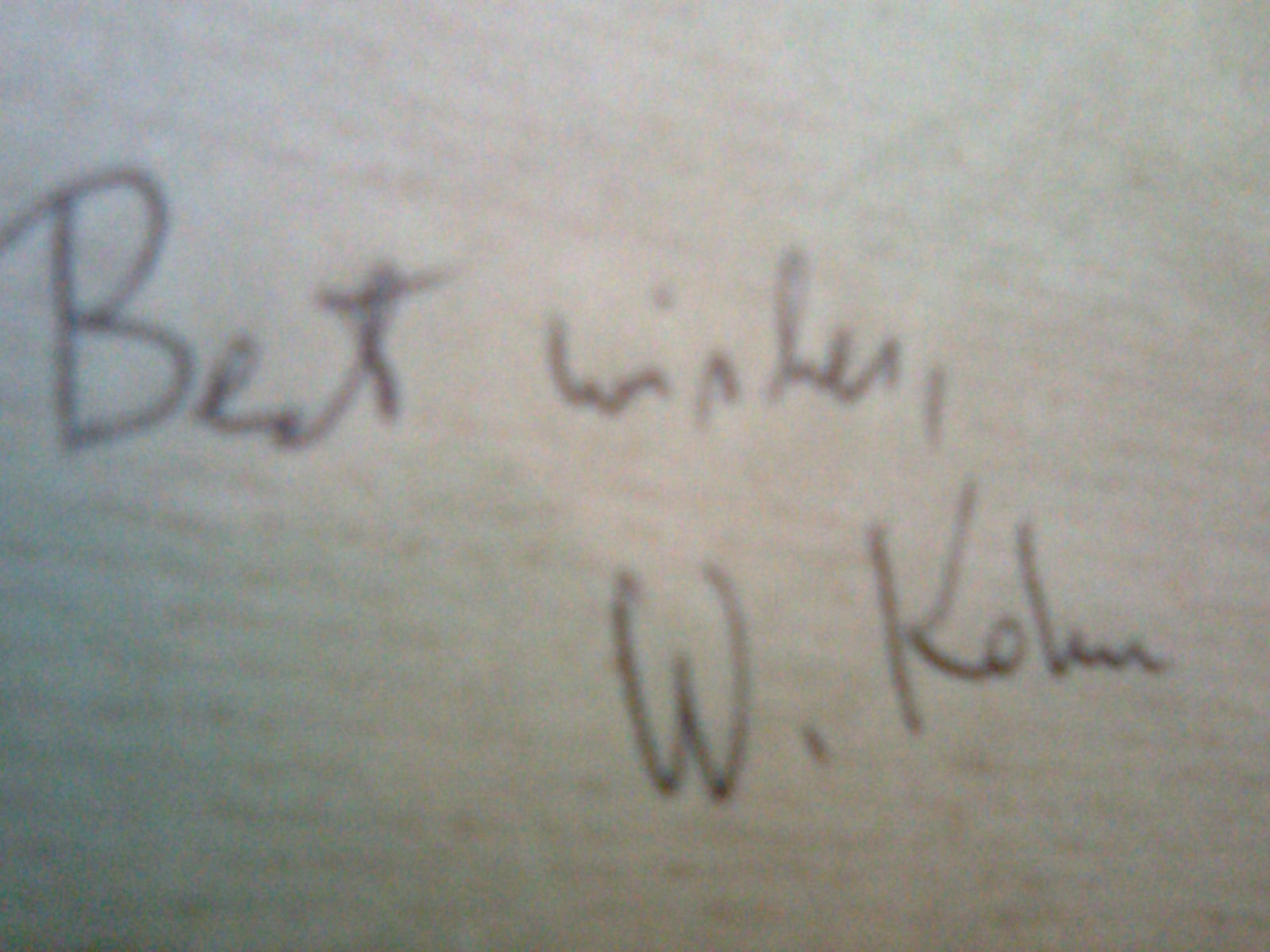

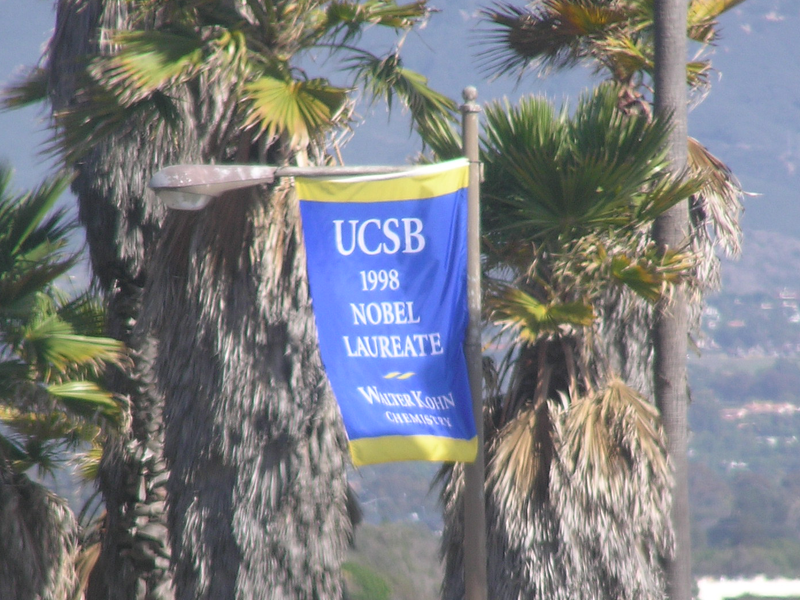
A banner on a lightpole at the University of California, Santa Barbara, commemorating Walter Kohn being awarded the Nobel Prize in Chemistry in 1998.

Walter Kohn (German pronunciation: [ˈvaltɐ ˈkoːn]; March 9, 1923 – April 19, 2016) was an Austrian-American theoretical physicist and theoretical chemist. He was awarded, with John Pople, the Nobel Prize in Chemistry in 1998. The award recognized their contributions to understanding the electronic properties of materials. In particular, Kohn played the leading role in the development of density functional theory, which made it possible to calculate quantum mechanical electronic structure by equations involving the electronic density (rather than the many-body wavefunction). This computational simplification led to more accurate calculations on complex systems as well as many new insights, and it has become an essential tool for materials science, condensed-phase physics, and the chemical physics of atoms and molecules.

== Early years in Canada ==
Kohn arrived in England as part of the Kindertransport rescue operation immediately after the annexation of Austria by Hitler. He was from a Jewish family, and has written, "My feelings towards Austria, my native land, are – and will remain – very painful. They are dominated by my vivid recollections of 1 1/2 years as a Jewish boy under the Nazi regime, and by the subsequent murder of my parents, Salomon and Gittel Kohn, of other relatives and several teachers, during the Holocaust. ... I want to mention that I have a strong Jewish identity and – over the years – have been involved in several Jewish projects, such as the establishment of a strong program of Judaic Studies at the University of California, San Diego.". Kohn also has identified as Deist.

Because he was an Austrian national, he was transferred to Canada in July 1940 after the outbreak of World War II. As a 17-year-old, Kohn traveled as part of a British convoy moving through U-boat-infested waters to Quebec City in Canada; and from there, by train, to a camp in Trois-Rivières. He was at first held in detention in a camp near Sherbrooke, Quebec. This camp, as well as others, provided a small number of educational facilities that Kohn used to the fullest, and he finally succeeded in entering the University of Toronto. As a German national, the future Nobel Laureate in Chemistry was not allowed to enter the chemistry building, so he opted for physics and mathematics.

== Scientific career ==
Kohn received a war-time bachelor's degree in applied mathematics at the end of his one-year army service, having completed only 2½ out of the 4-year undergraduate program, from University College at the University of Toronto in 1945; he was awarded an M.A. degree in applied mathematics by Toronto in 1946. Kohn was awarded a Ph.D. degree in physics by Harvard University in 1948, where he worked under Julian Schwinger on the three-body scattering problem. At Harvard, he also fell under the influence of J. H. Van Vleck and developed an interest in solid-state physics.

He moved from Harvard to Carnegie Mellon University from 1950 to 1960, after a short stint in Copenhagen as a National Research Council of Canada post-doctoral fellow. At Carnegie Mellon, he did much of his seminal work on multiple-scattering band-structure work, now known as the KKR method. His association with Bell Labs got him involved with semiconductor physics and produced a long and fruitful collaboration with Luttinger (including, for example, development of the Luttinger-Kohn model of semiconductor band structure). In 1960 he moved to the newly founded University of California, San Diego, held a term as the physics department chair, and remained until 1979. It was during this period, he, along with his student Chanchal Kumar Majumdar developed the Kohn–Majumdar theorem related to Fermi gas and its bound and unbound states. He then accepted the founding director's position at the new Institute for Theoretical Physics in Santa Barbara. He took his position as a professor in the Physics Department at the University of California, Santa Barbara in 1984; where he worked until the end of his life.

Kohn made significant contributions to semiconductor physics, which led to his award of the Oliver E. Buckley Prize by the American Physical Society. He was also awarded the Feenburg medal for his contributions to the many-body problem. His work on density functional theory was initiated during a visit to the École Normale Supérieure in Paris, with Pierre Hohenberg, and was prompted by a consideration of alloy theory. The Hohenberg–Kohn theorem was further developed, in collaboration with Lu Jeu Sham, to produce the Kohn-Sham equations. The latter is the standard workhorse of modern materials science, and even used in quantum theories of plasmas. In 2004, a study of all citations to the Physical Review journals from 1893 until 2003, found Kohn to be an author of five of the 100 papers with the "highest citation impact", including the first two.

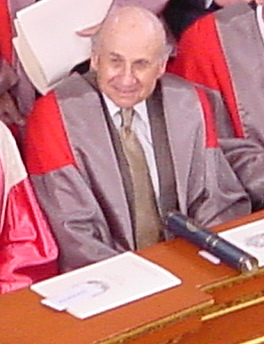
Walter Kohn receiving an honorary doctorate at The University of Oxford

In 1957, he relinquished his Canadian citizenship and became a naturalized citizen of the United States.

In 1963 Kohn became a Member of the American Academy of Arts and Sciences, a Member of the National Academy of Sciences in 1969, and a member of the American Philosophical Society in 1994. In 2011, he became an honorary member of the Austrian Academy of Sciences (ÖAW). He was also a Member of the International Academy of Quantum Molecular Science.

== Death ==
Kohn died from jaw cancer at his home in Santa Barbara, California, on April 19, 2016, at the age of 93.

== Awards and honors ==
- Oliver E. Buckley prize in Solid State Physics (American Physical Society, 1961)
- Davisson-Germer Prize (American Physical Society, 1977)
- National Medal of Science (1988)
- Nobel Prize in Chemistry (1998)
- Elected a Foreign Member of the Royal Society (ForMemRS) in 1998
- Austrian Decoration for Science and Art (1999)
- Grand Decoration of Honour in Silver with Star for Services to the Republic of Austria (2008)
- Harvard University awarded him an Honorary Doctor of Science (May 2012)

== Selected publications ==
- W. Kohn, "An essay on condensed matter physics in the twentieth century," Reviews of Modern Physics, Vol. 71, No. 2, pp. S59–S77, Centenary 1999. APS
- W. Kohn, "Nobel Lecture: Electronic structure of matter — wave functions and density functionals," Reviews of Modern Physics, Vol. 71, No. 5, pp. 1253–1266 (1999). APS
- D. Jérome, T.M. Rice, and W. Kohn, "Excitonic Insulator," Physical Review, Vol. 158, No. 2, pp. 462–475 (1967). APS
- P. Hohenberg, and W. Kohn, "Inhomogeneous Electron Gas," Physical Review, Vol. 136, No. 3B, pp. B864–B871 (1964). APS
- W. Kohn, and L. J. Sham, "Self-Consistent Equations Including Exchange and Correlation Effects," Physical Review, Vol. 140, No. 4A, pp. A1133–A1138 (1965). APS
- W. Kohn, and J. M. Luttinger, "New Mechanism for Superconductivity," Physical Review Letters, Vol. 15, No. 12, pp. 524–526 (1965). APS
- W. Kohn, "Theory of the Insulating State," Physical Review, Vol. 133, No. 1A, pp. A171–A181 (1964). APS
- W. Kohn, "Cyclotron Resonance and de Haas-van Alphen Oscillations of an Interacting Electron Gas," Physical Review, Vol. 123, pp. 1242–1244 (1961). APS

== See also ==
- List of Jewish Nobel laureates
- List of Nobel laureates affiliated with the University of California, Santa Barbara
- List of refugees
