= Andrew Garrad =

British businessman and engineer (born 1953)

Andrew Garrad CBE
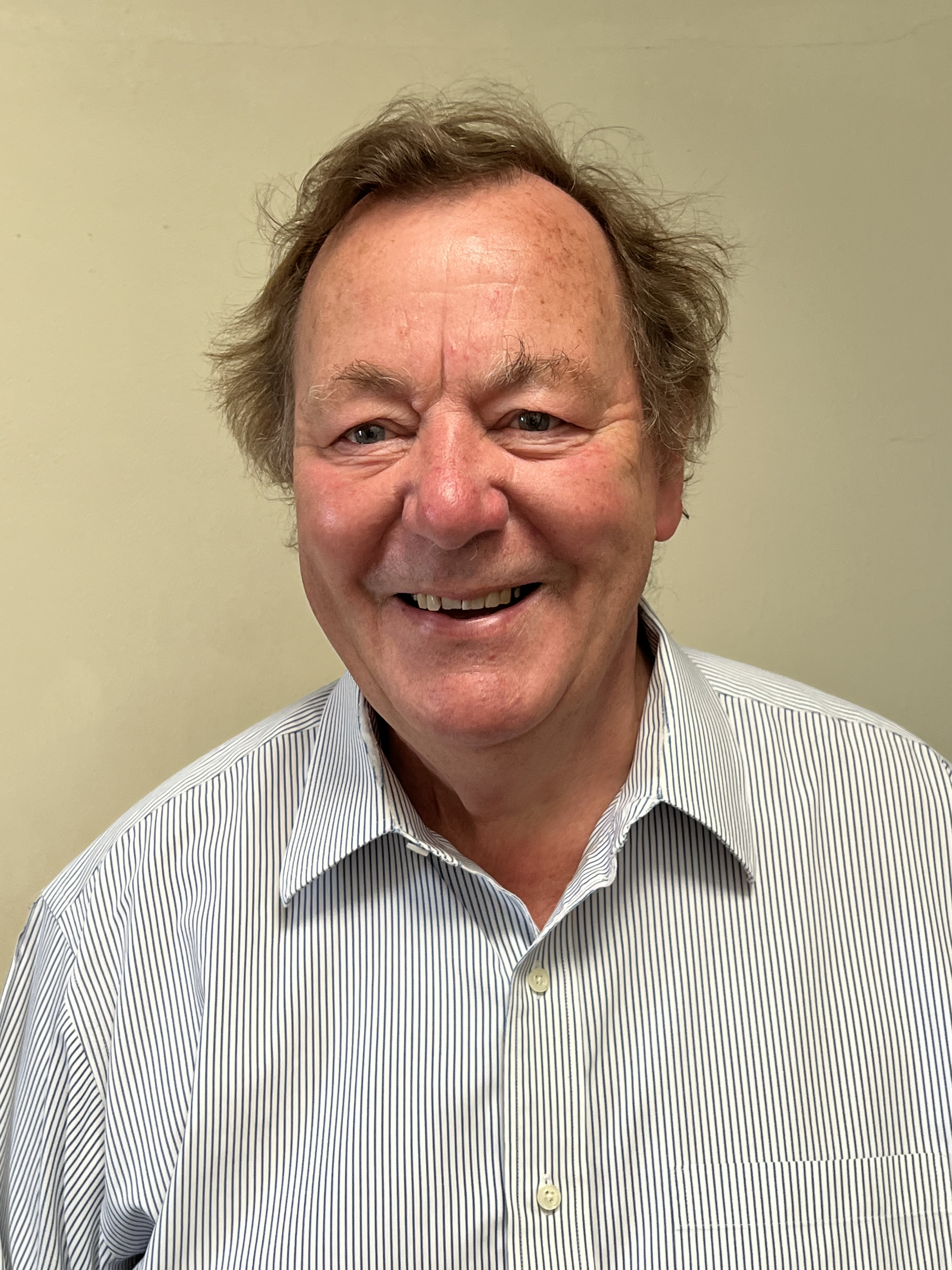
- Garrad in 2023
- Born: 8 November 1953 (age 72); Braunston, England
- Years active: 1971–present
- Title: Former President and CEO, GL Garrad Hassan; Former President, European Wind Energy Association

Andrew Douglas Garrad CBE (born 8 November 1953) is an engineer and businessman who co-founded the wind power industry consulting company Garrad Hassan in 1984.

== Early life and education ==
Andrew Garrad has a BA in Engineering Science from the University of Oxford and received a PhD in theoretical fluid mechanics from the University of Exeter, where he used mathematical modelling to study boundary-layer flow over dolphins. His interest in wind energy was sparked by a lecture by Ernst Schumacher in Oxford, in 1971. That same year, he built his first wind turbine at his parents' home.

== Career ==
Garrad has been professionally involved in wind energy since 1979, when he joined the Wind Energy Group. Mathematical modelling remained his main enthusiasm and Garrad Hassan was founded to provide mathematical models for various aspects of wind energy. The company mission was to be able to predict the weather, through the turbines and wind farms, the electricity they provided to the grid, and the resulting cash flow. In 1984, Garrad wrote the initial version of the wind turbine system aeroelastic code Bladed, which is still used to this day. The company produced many other computational tools later adopted by the industry. GH, together with the offshore consultancy Tecnomare, was among the first to conduct floating offshore wind turbine design studies. Although GH specialized in wind energy, it also provided parallel services in wave and tidal energy, such as with its WaveDyn software for predicting the dynamic behavior of wave energy devices.

Garrad was co-Chair, with the Chinese Minister of Electric Power, of the first Chinese International Wind Energy Conference in Beijing in 1995, at a time when China had yet to develop its wind energy sector. Later on, starting at the turn of the century, GH contributed to the development of the emerging Chinese wind industry through design contracts and strategic advice on offshore wind projects.

Garrad was previously Chairman of the British Wind Energy Association, now Renewable UK. He was President of European Wind Energy Association (EWEA, now Wind Europe) from 2013 to 2014. Garrad chaired Bristol's year as European Green Capital in 2015.

Garrad sold Garrad Hassan to Germanischer Lloyd in 2009 and became President of the combined company, GL Garrad Hassan, and hence was responsible for both consultancy and certification. When Garrad retired in 2015, the company had grown to 1,000 staff in 29 countries. In retirement he remains active in wind energy and, in 2019, he was appointed Royal Academy of Engineering Visiting Professor in Renewable Energy by the University of Bristol. In 2023 Garrad was appointed visiting professor in the Department of Engineering Mathematics. Garrad’s job is to introduce students to the engineering world outside university. In March 2024 he became Chair of the Severn Estuary Commission whose task was to investigate the feasibility of generating electricity from the Severn Estuary in the UK.

Garrad has previously donated to the Green Party of England and Wales, and its former leader Carla Denyer.

== Awards and prizes ==
Garrad received honorary doctorates of engineering, DEng, from the University of Bristol in 2009 and from the University of Exeter in 2018. He received a DSc, Doctor of Science, from the University of Plymouth in 2024. Garrad was a member of the Council (Governing Body) of the University of Bristol from 2012 to 2016 and is on the advisory board of the Cabot Institute. He is a Fellow of the Institution of Mechanical Engineers and the Royal Academy of Engineering and an Honorary Fellow of New College, Oxford.

Garrad was appointed a Commander of the Order of the British Empire (CBE) "for services to renewable energy" in the 2017 New Year Honours.

The industry magazine Wind Power Monthly has named Garrad one of "the most influential people in the wind energy business" on several occasions. The magazine referred to him on his retirement as "the godfather of wind energy technology." OGM named him one of the world's seven most influential energy leaders; Daily Magazine made a similar reference.

In 2006, he received the EWEA's Poul la Cour prize for "outstanding achievements in the field of wind energy." In 2015 he became the only non-Greek recipient to have ever received the Aeolus prize from the Hellenic Wind Energy Association.

In 2024, he and Henrik Stiesdal received the global Queen Elizabeth Prize for Engineering for their work on the development of high performance wind turbines. In 2025 the European Academy of Wind Energy gave him their Scientific Award.

== Private life ==
Garrad lives in Bristol, England and is married with four children.
