= Athletics at the 1985 Summer Universiade – Men's decathlon =

The men's decathlon event at the 1985 Summer Universiade was held at the Kobe Universiade Memorial Stadium in Kobe on 2 and 3 September 1985.

== Results ==
The highest mark recorded in each event is highlighted in yellow

Rank	Athlete	Nationality	100m	LJ	SP	HJ	400m	110m H	DT	PV	JT	1500m	Points	Notes
1st place, gold medalist(s)	Mike Ramos	United States	11.11	7.15	14.39	2.09	50.12	15.34	45.98	5.00	62.20	4:43.29	8071	
2nd place, silver medalist(s)	Valter Külvet	Soviet Union	11.32	6.96	15.18	1.88	48.81	15.09	48.26	4.70	64.14	4:34.18	7971	
3rd place, bronze medalist(s)	Michael Neugebauer	West Germany	10.99	7.39	13.18	2.09	48.74	14.92	43.36	4.20	57.68	4:34.27	7895	
4	Enno Tiepkema	Netherlands	11.11	7.56	13.20	2.00	50.07	14.78	36.20	4.40	67.56	4:31.09	7863	
5	Patrick Gellens	France	11.13	7.06	13.26	1.94	49.52	16.12	39.64	5.00	49.66	4:45.23	7447	
6	Rainer Sonnenburg	West Germany	10.99	7.43	15.86	1.88	50.01	15.45	38.30	3.80	57.92	5:05.19	7359	
7	Athanasios Pampaliaris	Greece	11.63	7.04	14.42	1.94	51.08	15.54	41.70	4.60	55.66	4:59.12	7328	
8	Xi Xiashun	China	11.41	7.07	12.90	2.06	50.99	15.48	36.24	4.60	52.56	5:03.83	7227	
9	Takeshi Kojyo	Japan	11.38	6.84	12.76	1.97	50.44	16.04	42.28	4.30	56.14	4:55.03	7187	
10	Stuart Andrews	Australia	11.36	6.94	12.75	1.88	50.74	16.37	38.90	4.30	60.18	4:40.00	7167	
11	Marc Kemp	Luxembourg	11.35	7.34	11.87	1.88	50.67	15.82	34.98	4.40	51.38	4:46.17	7057	
12	Atsushi Saito	Japan	11.66	6.74	11.39	1.97	51.51	15.67	37.90	4.20	52.78	4:40.94	6932	
13	Simon Shirley	Australia	11.45	7.54	11.86	2.00	49.09	16.39	34.18	NM	50.34	4:25.28	6572	
	John Sayre	United States	11.26	6.90	13.83	1.97	50.65	15.49	42.50	4.80	63.96	DNS	DNF	
	Ahmed Mahour Bacha	Algeria											DNF	
	Paulo Lima	Brazil											DNF	
