= Athletics at the 1979 Pan American Games – Men's decathlon =

Men's decathlon at the 1979 Pan American Games
- Venue: Estadio Sixto Escobar
- Dates: 12 & 13 July
- Winning result: 8078

Medalists
Gold medal	Bobby Coffman	United States
Silver medal	Tito Steiner	Argentina
Bronze medal	Zenon Smiechowski	Canada

The men's decathlon competition of the athletics events at the 1979 Pan American Games took place on 12 and 13 July at the Estadio Sixto Escobar.

== Records ==
Prior to this competition, the existing world and Pan American Games records were as follows:

World record	Bruce Jenner (USA)	8634	Montreal, Canada	July 30, 1976
Pan American Games record	Bruce Jenner (USA)	8045	Mexico City, Mexico	October 1975

== Results ==
KEY:	WR	World Record	GR	Pan American Record

The highest mark recorded in each event is highlighted in yellow

Rank	Athlete	Nationality	100m	LJ	SP	HJ	400m	110m H	DT	PV	JT	1500m	Points	Notes
1st place, gold medalist(s)	Bobby Coffman	United States	10.61	7.05	15.63	1.94	49.11	13.96w	47.10	4.20	52.04	4:42.1	8078	GR
2nd place, silver medalist(s)	Tito Steiner	Argentina	11.28w	7.27	14.64	1.91	50.31	15.56w	44.04	4.60	57.50	4:53.0	7638	
3rd place, bronze medalist(s)	Zenon Smiechowski	Canada	11.26w	6.80	14.37	1.97	52.33	16.28w	42.80	3.80	61.68	5:00.7	7337	
4	Roberto Steinmetz	Argentina	11.75w	6.61	12.80	1.91	53.12	16.12w	40.60	4.40	52.92	4:38.9	7021	
5	Roberto McFarlane	Costa Rica	11.05	6.83	11.44	1.82	50.37	16.01w	30.00	3.70	48.16	4:46.6	6669	
	Rigoberto Salazar	Cuba	11.09	7.32	14.72	1.97	51.11	14.71w	46.14	?	–	–	DNF	
	Paulo Lima	Brazil	11.02	6.85	11.85	1.94	48.72	16.14	35.40	?	–	–	DNF	
	Dave Steen	Canada	11.34	7.18	11.15	2.03	50.78	16.03w	34.50	?	DNS	–	DNF	
	Alfredo Silva	Chile	11.55	6.55	11.94	1.91	52.52	16.19	35.40	?	?	–	DNF	
	Pedro Burgos	Puerto Rico	11.43	6.47	12.02	NM	53.76	17.34	37.08	?	?	–	DNF	
	John Mascoll	Barbados	11.10	7.06	12.91	1.73	?	–	–	–	–	–	DNF	
	Renato Bortolocci	Brazil	11.14	5.84	11.84	?	?	–	–	–	–	–	DNF	
	John Crist	United States	DNS	–	–	–	–	–	–	–	–	–	DNS	
	Juan Ríos	Venezuela	DNS	–	–	–	–	–	–	–	–	–	DNS	
