= Paulo Lima (athlete) =

Brazilian athlete

Personal information
- Full name: Paulo Antônio Martins Lima
- Born: 14 February 1958 (age 68)
- Height: 1.88 m (6 ft 2 in)
- Weight: 89 kg (196 lb)

Sport
- Sport: Athletics
- Event: Decathlon

Paulo Antônio Martins Lima (born 14 February 1958) is a retired Brazilian athlete who specialised in the decathlon. He won several medals at continental level.

His personal best in the event is 7936 points set in São Paulo in 1985.

== International competitions ==
Year	Competition	Venue	Position	Event	Notes
Representing Brazil
1975	South American Youth Championships	Quito, Ecuador	6th (h)	200 m	22.6 s
1975	South American Youth Championships	Quito, Ecuador	2nd	4 × 100 m relay	42.8
1975	South American Youth Championships	Quito, Ecuador	1st	4 × 400 m relay	3:27.3
1979	Pan American Games	San Juan, Puerto Rico	–	Decathlon	DNF
1981	Universiade	Bucharest, Romania	3rd	4 × 400 m relay	3:06.79
1981	Universiade	Bucharest, Romania	9th	Decathlon	7347 pts
1981	South American Championships	La Paz, Bolivia	1st	Decathlon	7383 pts
1983	Universiade	Edmonton, Canada	–	Decathlon	DNF
1983	Pan American Games	Caracas, Venezuela	–	Decathlon	DNF
1985	Universiade	Kobe, Japan	–	Decathlon	DNF
1985	South American Championships	Santiago, Chile	1st	Decathlon	7341 pts
1987	South American Championships	São Paulo, Brazil	1st	Decathlon	7491 pts

== Personal bests ==
Outdoor

- Decathlon – 7936 (São Paulo 1985)

Indoor

- Heptathlon – 5679 (Dortmund 1986)
- Pole vault – 4.60 (Dortmund 1986)
- Shot put – 15.35 (Dortmund 1986)
