= Renato Bortolocci =

Brazilian pole vaulter

Personal information
- Full name: Renato Bortolocci Ferreira
- Born: 3 May 1956 (age 70)

Sport
- Sport: Athletics
- Events: Pole vault, decathlon, high jump

Renato Bortolocci Ferreira (born 3 May 1956) is a retired Brazilian athlete who competed primarily in the pole vault and decathlon. He won multiple medals at regional level.

== International competitions ==
Year	Competition	Venue	Position	Event	Notes
Representing Brazil
1974	South American Junior Championships	Lima, Peru	2nd	High jump	1.91 m
1974	South American Junior Championships	Lima, Peru	1st	Pole vault	4.35 m
1974	South American Junior Championships	Lima, Peru	3rd	Hexathlon	3687 pts
1975	South American Championships	Rio de Janeiro, Brazil	7th	High jump	1.95 m
1975	South American Championships	Rio de Janeiro, Brazil	1st	Pole vault	4.50 m
1977	South American Championships	Montevideo, Uruguay	1st	Pole vault	4.40 m
1977	South American Championships	Montevideo, Uruguay	2nd	Decathlon	7076 pts
1979	Universiade	San Juan, Puerto Rico	–	Decathlon	DNF
1981	South American Championships	La Paz, Bolivia	3rd	Pole vault	4.60 m
1983	Universiade	Edmonton, Canada	27th (q)	High jump	2.00 m
1983	Universiade	Edmonton, Canada	6th	Decathlon	7443 pts
1983	South American Championships	Santa Fe, Argentina	2nd	Pole vault	4.60 m
1985	South American Championships	Santiago, Chile	4th	Pole vault	4.80 m
1987	South American Championships	São Paulo, Brazil	3rd	Pole vault	5.05 m
1988	Ibero-American Championships	Mexico City, Mexico	6th	Pole vault	4.80 m
1989	South American Championships	Medellín, Colombia	1st	Pole vault	5.10 m
1990	Ibero-American Championships	Manaus, Brazil	8th	Pole vault	4.60 m
1992	Ibero-American Championships	Seville, Spain	10th	Pole vault	4.80 m
1995	South American Championships	Manaus, Brazil	3rd	Pole vault	4.40 m

== Personal bests ==
Outdoor

- High jump – 2.12 (Edmonton 1983)
- Pole vault – 5.20 (São Paulo 1989)
- Decathlon – 7594 (São Paulo 1983)
