= Athletics at the 1983 Pan American Games – Men's decathlon =

Men's decathlon at the Pan American Games

The men's decathlon event at the 1983 Pan American Games was held in Caracas, Venezuela on 26 and 27 August. The event brought together some of the strongest all-round athletes in the Americas, testing their endurance, speed and versatility across the ten disciplines. Canada’s Dave Steen emerged as the overall winner, amassing 7,958 points to claim the gold medal.

Venezuela was the host and they celebrated a double podium finish, with Douglas Fernández capturing the silver after setting a new national record of 7,726 points, while Freddy Aberdeen secured the bronze with the same score but placed behind Fernández on countback. The competition was regarded as one of the highlights of the athletics program, not only for the high level of performance but also for the enthusiastic support of the Venezuelan crowd.

== Results ==
The highest mark recorded in each event is highlighted in yellow

Rank	Athlete	Nationality	100m	LJ	SP	HJ	400m	110m H	DT	PV	JT	1500m	Points	Notes
1st place, gold medalist(s)	Dave Steen	Canada	11.21	7.34	11.67	2.09	48.44	14.99	40.67	4.90	59.97	4:29.26	7958	
2nd place, silver medalist(s)	Douglas Fernández	Venezuela	11.67	6.90	13.43	1.90	49.95	16.04	45.62	4.40	78.86	4:30.80	7726	NR
3rd place, bronze medalist(s)	Freddy Aberdeen	Venezuela	11.10	7.26	10.92	1.90	49.48	15.13	33.43	4.40	50.57	4:35.84	7726	
	Tito Steiner	Argentina	11.47	7.12	14.47	2.05	49.84	14.79	49.12	NM	DNS	–	DNF	
	Paulo Lima	Brazil	10.88	7.03	13.43	1.99	47.27	16.79	DNS	–	–	–	DNF	
	Gary Bastien	United States	DNS	–	–	–	–	–	–	–	–	–	DNS	
	John Crist	United States	DNS	–	–	–	–	–	–	–	–	–	DNS	
