= Jens Lindhard =

Danish theoretical physicist (1922–1997)

- Born: 26 February 1922; Tystofte, Denmark
- Died: 15 October 1997 (aged 75); Denmark
- Known for: Lindhard potential Lindhard theory Lindhard–Scharff–Schiøt theory
- Awards: H. C. Ørsted Medal (1974); Rigmor and Carl Holst-Knudsen Award for Scientific Research (1965)
- Scientific career
- Institutions: University of Aarhus

Jens Lindhard (26 February 1922 – 15 October 1997) was a Danish physicist and professor at Aarhus University working on condensed matter physics, statistical physics and special relativity. He was the president of the Royal Danish Academy of Sciences and Letters between 1981 and 1988.

He is known for the development of the Lindhard theory, that describes the behaviour of metals under the influence of electromagnetic fields, named in his honour. He is also known for the development of channelling theory, to describe the path of a charged particle in a crystalline solid.

== Early life ==
Jens Lindhard was born in Tystofte, Denmark in 1922, son of Erik and Agnes Lindhard. He was the youngest son of six, consisting of four girls and two boys. Jens' father was a professor at University of Copenhagen Faculty of Life Sciences but died young in 1928. Jens' older brother was a bomber in England and died during the Invasion of Normandy.

Jens went to school at the Metropolitanskolen.

Later, during his university studies, Jens joined the Danish Brigade in Sweden and also joined them back in the defence of the Danish-German border.

He started his studies in physics at the Niels Bohr Institute and in 1945 he received a Master of Science degree in physics from University of Copenhagen.

== Research ==
During his university years, he worked under the supervision of Oskar Klein in Sweden on superconductivity, publishing his first major work on the subject in 1944.

Later he moved to work with Rudolf Peierls in the University of Birmingham. There, in 1954, he published the first description of the dielectric function of metals in the linear response regime, today known as Lindhard theory.

In 1950, he worked in close collaboration with Niels Bohr in Blegdamsvej on the penetration of particles in matter. There Lindhard, Morten Scharff and H. E. Schiøt developed what is now known as the LSS theory (carrying their initials), which describes the penetration of low-energy ions. He also worked in fundamental problems related to statistical physics and relativity. As a teaching assistant, he helped to verify the formulas and problems in Christian Møller's The Theory of Relativity. Later Lindhard would provide a solution to the controversy related to the transformation of temperature in special relativity.

Lindhard moved to Aarhus University in 1957 in collaboration with experimentalist Karl Ove Nielsen, where he created and led a research group to study the penetration of charged particles in crystal lattices. During his time in Aarhus, Lindhard developed what is now known as the classical theory of channelling (sometimes also referred as Lindhard's theory) in continuum models in 1965.

== Awards and membership ==
Jens Lindhard received several awards including:

- the Rigmor and Carl Holst-Knudsen Award for Scientific Research in 1965
- the H. C. Ørsted Medal in 1974
- the Danish Physical Society Physics award in 1988
- Honorary Doctorate degrees from Odense University in 1996 and Fudan University, Shanghai, in 1997

Jens Linhard was member of the Royal Danish Academy of Sciences and Letters and a member of the Akademiet for de tekniske Videnskaber since 1962. We was president of the Royal Society from 1981–1988. He was also member of the Koninklijke Hollandsche Maatschappij der Wetenschappen since 1984.
