= Valter Külvet =

Estonian decathlete (1964–1998)

Personal information
- Nationality: Estonian
- Born: 19 February 1964 Õisu, Estonia
- Died: 2 July 1998 (aged 34) Mäksa, Estonia

Sport
- Sport: Athletics
- Event: Decathlon
Medal record
Representing Soviet Union
Summer Universiade
Silver medal – second place	1985 Kobe	Decathlon

Valter Külvet (19 February 1964 – 2 July 1998) was an Estonian athlete. He competed in the men's decathlon at the 1988 Summer Olympics, representing the Soviet Union. He died due to injuries received from a beating while being robbed. He won a gold medal at the 1983 European Athletics Junior Championships and a silver medal at the 1985 Summer Universiade.
