= Rigoberto Salazar =

Cuban decathlete

Personal information
- Full name: Rigoberto Salazar Matos
- Born: 4 January 1954

Sport
- Sport: Athletics
- Event: Decathlon
Medal record
Representing Cuba
Central American and Caribbean Games
Gold medal – first place	1978 Medellin	Decathlon
Silver medal – second place	1974 Santo Domingo	Decathlon

Rigoberto Salazar Matos (born 4 January 1954) is a retired Cuban athlete who specialised in the decathlon. He won several medals at regional level.

His personal best in the event is 7756 points set in Havana in 1979 (1962–1984 tables).

== International competitions ==
Year	Competition	Venue	Position	Event	Notes
Representing Cuba
1973	Central American and Caribbean Championships	Maracaibo, Venezuela	2nd	Decathlon	7035 pts
1974	Central American and Caribbean Games	Santo Domingo, Dominican Republic	2nd	Decathlon	7305 pts
1975	Pan American Games	Mexico City, Mexico	–	Decathlon	DNF
1977	Central American and Caribbean Championships	Xalapa, Mexico	1st	Decathlon	7207 pts
1977	Universiade	Sofia, Bulgaria	–	Decathlon	DNF
1978	Central American and Caribbean Games	Medellín, Colombia	1st	Decathlon	7485 pts
1979	Pan American Games	San Juan, Puerto Rico	–	Decathlon	DNF
1979	Universiade	Mexico City, Mexico	–	Decathlon	DNF
1981	Central American and Caribbean Championships	Santo Domingo, Dominican Republic	1st	Decathlon	7181 pts
1981	Universiade	Bucharest, Romania	–	Decathlon	DNF
