= UA9 experiment =

High energy particle physics experiment

Super Proton–Antiproton Synchrotron (Spp̅S)
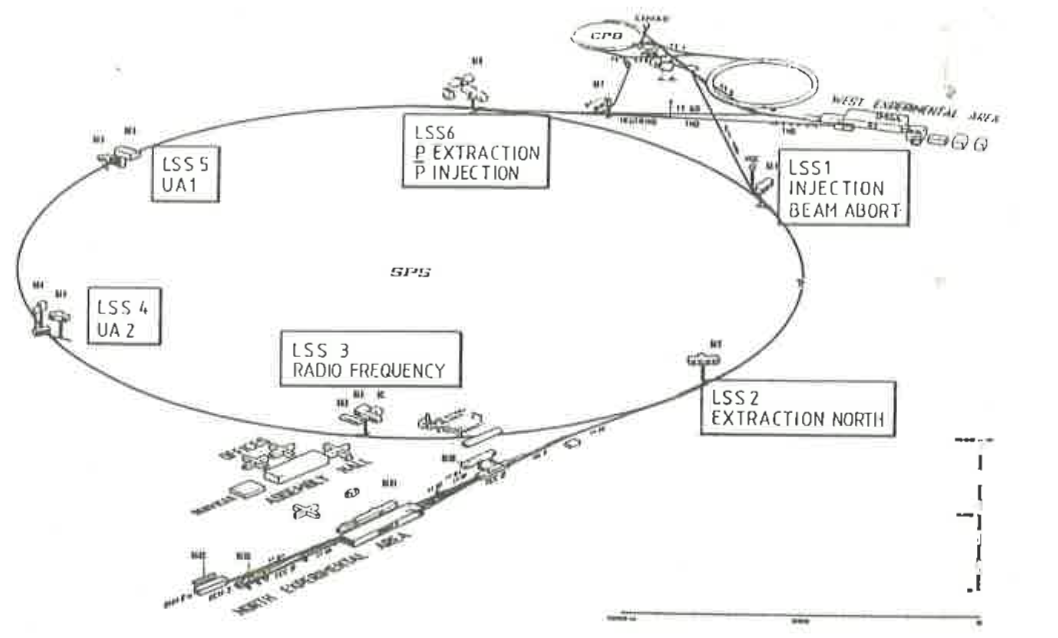

Key Spp̅S Experiments
- UA1: Underground Area 1
- UA2: Underground Area 2
- UA4: Underground Area 4
- UA5: Underground Area 5

Spp̅S pre-accelerators
- PS: Proton Synchrotron
- AA: Antiproton Accumulator

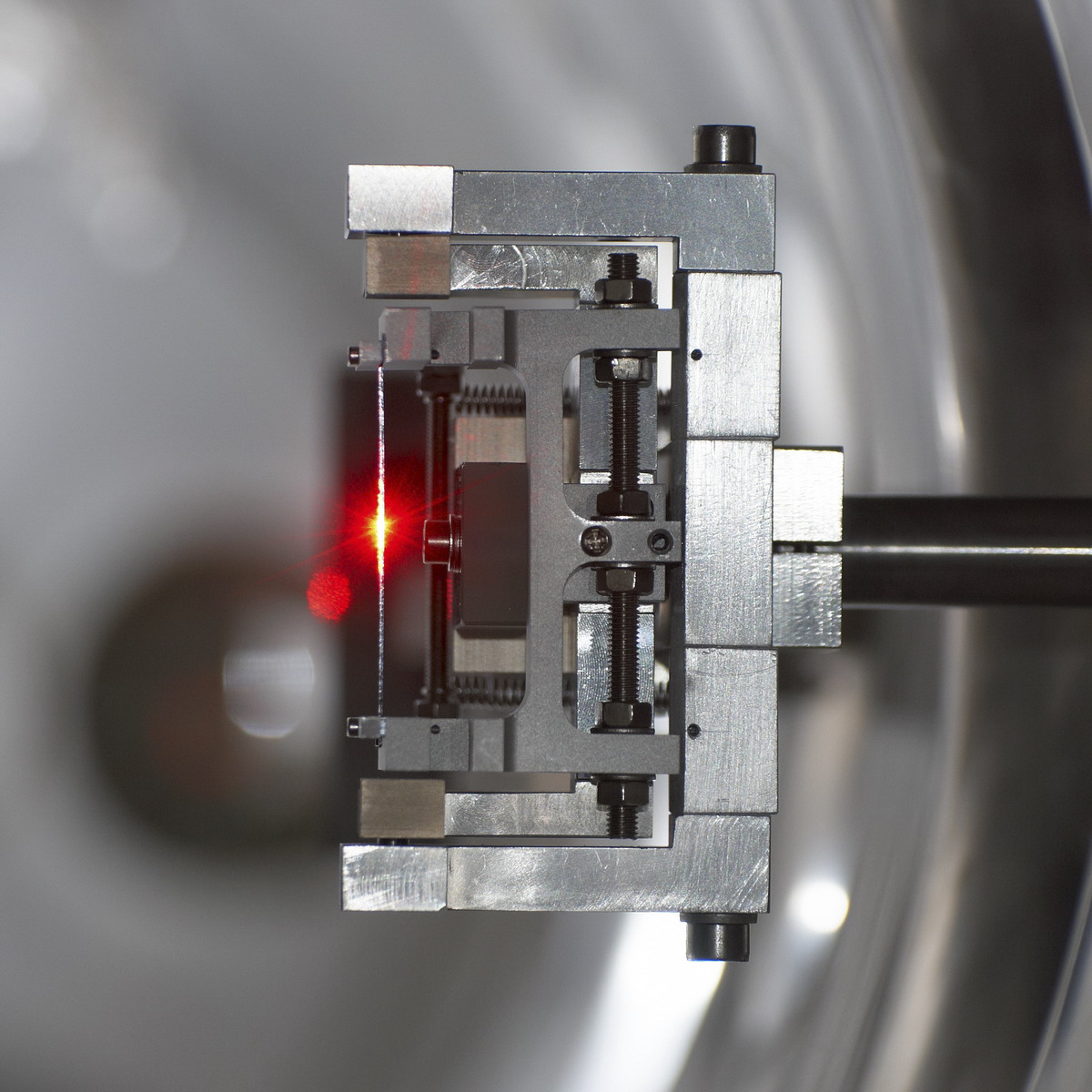
UA9 bent crystal tested with a laser

The Underground Area 9 (UA9) experiment is a high-energy physics experiment using particle beams from the Super Proton Synchrotron (SPS), at CERN. The purpose of the experiment is to investigate how using tiny bent crystals could allow the collimation of beams in modern hadron colliders to improve. UA9 was approved in 2008, and is in-progress as of 2013.

== Purpose ==
Charged particles that interact with a bent crystal can be deflected by the planes of the crystal lattice. In modern hadron colliders, high power loss may be seen due to a halo of particles around the core of the beam, which threatens the stability and protection of the operation. Collimators, in a multi-stage setup, can be used to absorb these halos. The use of bent crystals as collimators would improve absorption, as the halo can be deflected at larger angles, and therefore may improve the power loss of modern hadron colliders such as the LHC.

== Experimental setup ==
The UA9 experiment setup consists of a double crystal layout, with crystals named Crystal1 and Crystal2. The setup also contains linear and angular position actuators which align the crystals with respect to the circulating beam, as well as beam intercepting devices, detectors and beam loss monitors (BLMs). These devices test the collimation produced by the crystal.

The proton beam available in the H8 beamline of the CERN SPS, where the experiment takes place, is a narrow, low-divergence 400 GeV/c beam. The difference of the outgoing and incoming angles of the beam gives the deflection angle for each particle. Five pairs of silicon micro strip detectors were used to measure these angles. The deflected halo is absorbed by a movable tungsten absorber.

== Results ==
The initial results from the UA9 experiment demonstrate that crystal collimation is an achievable, reproducible technique for proton and lead ion beams. At the time, the experiment had incomplete results with regard to less reduction in the entirety of the SPS ring.
