= Pomeranchuk's theorem =

Cross section theorem

Pomeranchuk's theorem, named after Soviet physicist Isaak Pomeranchuk, states that difference of cross sections of interactions of elementary particles $\kappa_1+\kappa_2$ and $\kappa_1+\bar{\kappa_2}$ (i. e. particle ${\kappa_1}$ with particle $\kappa_2$, and with its antiparticle $\bar{\kappa_2}$) approach 0 when $s \to \infty$, where $s$ is the energy in center of mass system.

== See also ==
- Pomeron
