= Supermembranes =

Objects in eleven-dimensional supergravity

Supermembranes are hypothesized objects that live in the 11-dimensional theory called M-Theory and should also exist in eleven-dimensional supergravity. Supermembranes are a generalisation of superstrings to another dimension. Supermembranes are 2-dimensional surfaces. For example, they can be spherical or shaped like a torus. As in superstring theory the vibrations of the supermembranes correspond to different particles. Supermembranes also exhibit a symmetry called supersymmetry without which the vibrations would only correspond to bosons and not fermions.

== Energy ==
The energy of a classical supermembrane is given by its surface area. One consequence of this is that there is no difference between one or two membranes since two membranes can be connected by a long 1 dimensional string of zero area. Hence, the idea of 'membrane-number' has no meaning. A second consequence is that unlike strings a supermembrane's vibrations can represent several particles at once. In technical terms this means it is already 'second-quantized'. All the particles in the Universe can be thought to arise as vibrations of a single membrane.

== Spectrum ==
When going from the classical theory to the quantum theory of supermembranes it is found that they can only exist in 11 dimensions, just as superstrings can only exist in 10 dimensions. When examining the energy spectrum (the allowed frequencies that a string can vibrate in) it was found that they can only be in discrete values corresponding to the masses of different particles.

It has been shown:

- The energy spectrum for the classical bosonic membrane is continuous.
- The energy spectrum for the quantum bosonic membrane is discrete.
- The energy spectrum for the quantum supermembrane is continuous.

At first the discovery that the spectrum was continuous was thought to mean the theory didn't make sense. But it was realised that it meant that supermembranes actually correspond to multiple particles. (The continuous degrees of freedom corresponding to the coordinates/momenta of the additional particles).

== Action ==
The action for a classical membrane is simply the surface area of the world sheet. The quantum version is harder to write down, is non-linear and very difficult to solve. Unlike the superstring action which is quadratic, the supermembrane action is quartic which makes it exponentially harder. Adding to this the fact that a membrane can represent many particles at once not much progress has been made on supermembranes.

== Low energy sector ==
It has been proven that the low energy vibrations of the supermembrane correspond to the particles in 11 dimensional supergravity.

== Topology ==
A supermembrane can have multiple thing tubes or strings coming out of it with little or no extra energy cost since strings, for example, have no area. This means that all orientable topologies of membranes are physically the same. Also, joined and disjointed supermembranes are physically the same. Thus the topology of a supermembrane has no physical meaning.

== Mathematics ==
The infinite supermembrane can be described in terms of an infinite number of patches. The coordinates of (each patch of) a supermembrane at any casual slice of time are 11 dimensional and depend on two continuous parameters $(\sigma,\theta)$ and a third integer parameter (k) denoting the patch number:

$$X^k_\mu(\sigma,\theta) = x^k_\mu + O(\sigma,\theta)$$

Therefore, the super membrane can describe an infinite number of particles if we associate somehow the coordinate of each particle with some topological property of the patches - perhaps holes in the membrane or closed loops.

== Supermembrane Field Theory ==
Since supermembranes correspond to multiple particles the field theory of membranes correspond to a Fock space. Informally, let a(x) denote the continuous degrees of freedom in the energy spectrum:

$$\Phi[X] = \Phi[x,\mathbf{a},..] = \phi(x) + \int \mathbf{a}(y) \phi(x,y) dy + \int \mathbf{a}(y)\mathbf{a}(z) \phi(x,y,z)dydz + ...$$

The action can be written as

$$S = \int \Phi[X] \mathbf{Q} \Phi[X] D[X]$$

where Q is the kinetic operator. No interaction terms are needed since there is no concept of membrane number. Everything is the same membrane. The action is not quite the same type as the one for superstrings or particles since it involves terms with multiple particles. The terms relating to single fields must recover the classical field equations of Dirac, Maxwell and Einstein. The propagator to get from a state with membrane X to one at another conformal slice with membrane Y is:

$$G(X,Y) = \mathbf{Q^{-1}}(X,Y)$$

And since each membrane corresponds to any number of identical particles this is equivalent to all the Green's functions for many particle collisions at once!

Although it looks like a lot of things simplify in the supermembrane picture, the actual form of the kinetic operator Q is yet unknown and must be a very complicated operator acting on an infinite Fock-like space. Hence the seeming simplicity of the theory is hidden in this operator.

== Cosmology ==
Since the vibrations of a supermembrane of infinite energy can correspond to every particle in the Universe at once it is possible to interpret the supermembrane as equivalent to the Universe. i.e. all that exists is the supermembrane. It makes no difference to say we live on this supermembrane or that we are in 11 dimensional space-time. Every state of the Universe corresponds to a supermembrane and every history of the Universe corresponds to a supermembrane world volume. What we think of as space-time coordinates can equally be thought of as vector fields on the 2+1 dimensional supermembrane.

For a supermembrane moving at the speed of light, its world volume can be zero due to the metric (+++-). Thus the Big Bang can be thought of as a spherical membrane expanding at the speed of light. This has interesting interpretations in terms of the holographic principle.

== Geometry ==
Because the supermembrane(s) correspond to all particles at a particular causal time slice, it also corresponds to all the gravitons particles (which are particular vibrational modes). Thus the geometry of the 2+1D supermembrane contains within it the description of the geometry of the (macroscopic) 10+1D space-time. But as it is a quantum theory it gives probabilities for different space-times consistent with observation. The different space-times may only differ microscopically whereas the macroscopic space-time is smooth. In other words, the geometry of the membrane determines the geometry of (macroscopic) space-time. This is different from string theory where only condensates of many separate strings can macroscopically determine the space-time.

== Super-5-branes ==
M-Theory and eleven-dimensional supergravity also predict 5+1D objects called super-5-branes. An alternative cosmological theory is that we live on one of these branes.

== Compactification ==
Compactifying one space-time dimension on a circle and wrapping the membrane around this circle gives us superstring theory. To get back to our 3+1 dimensional universe the space-time coordinates need to be compactified on a 7 dimensional manifold (of G2 holonomy). Not much is known about these types of shapes.

== Matrix Theory ==
Matrix theory is a particular way of formulating supermembrane theory. It is still in development. The diagonal entries of an infinite dimensional matrix can be thought of as different supermembranes (parts) connected by 1 dimensional strings.
