= Isaak Pomeranchuk =

Soviet physicist (1913–1966)

- Исаак Померанчук
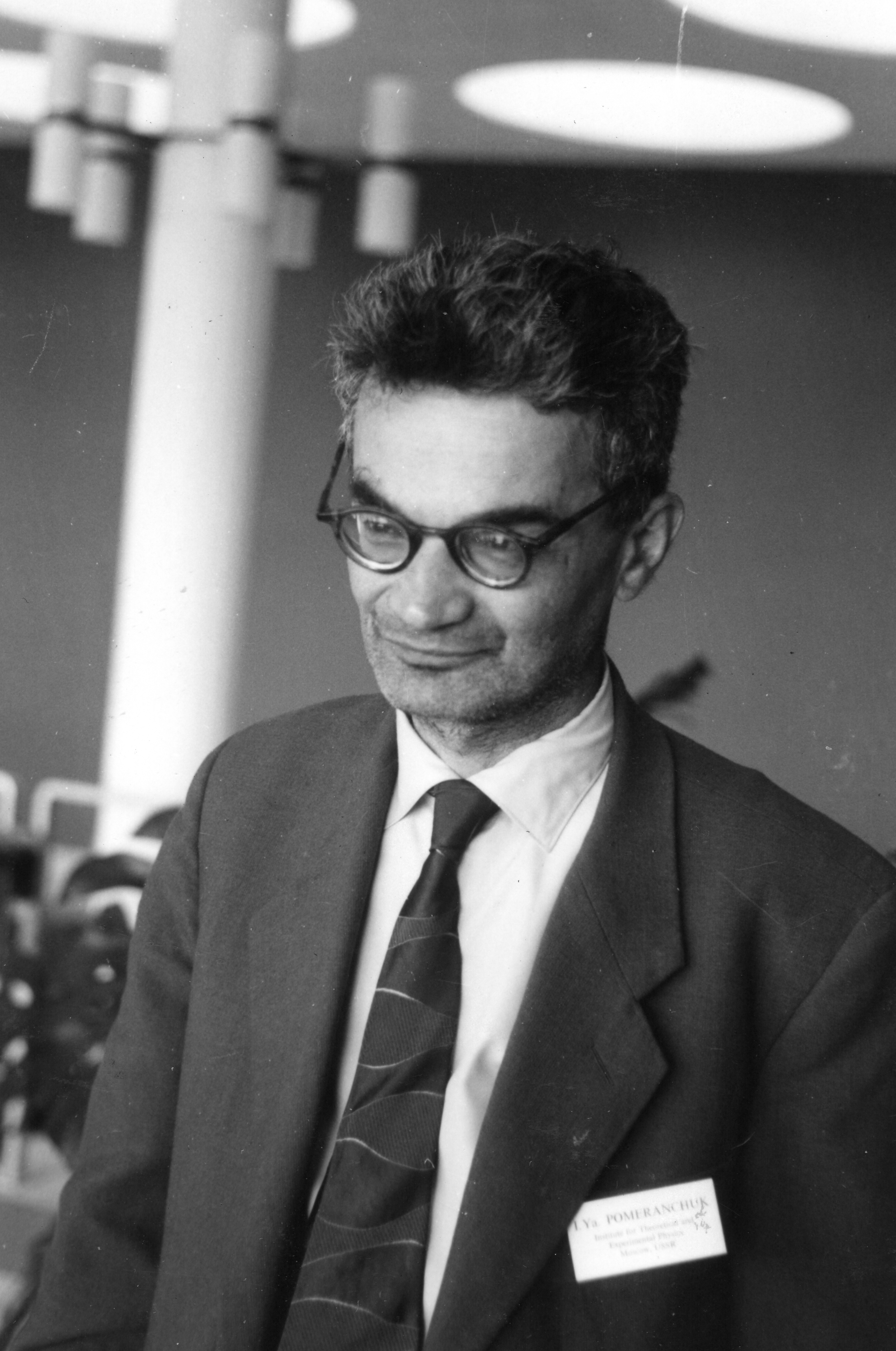
- Born: Isaak Yakovlevich Pomeranchuk; 20 May 1913; Warsaw, Poland, Russian Empire
- Died: 14 December 1966 (aged 53); Moscow, Soviet Union
- Education: Leningrad Polytechnic Institute
- Known for: Landau–Pomeranchuk–Migdal effect Pomeranchuk instability Pomeron; Pomeranchuk cooling Pomeranchuk's theorem Pomeranchuk singularity
- Awards: Order of Lenin (1952); Stalin Prize (1950)
- Scientific career
- Fields: Physics
- Institutions: Institute for Theoretical and Experimental Physics; Kharkov Institute of Physics and Technology; Lebedev Physical Institute
- Thesis: (1938)
- Doctoral advisor: Lev Landau

Isaak Yakovlevich Pomeranchuk (Russian: Исаа́к Я́ковлевич Померанчу́к; 20 May 1913 – 14 December 1966) was a Soviet physicist who participated in the Soviet nuclear weapons program. His career in physics spent mostly studying the particle physics (including thermonuclear weapons), quantum field theory, electromagnetic and synchrotron radiation, condensed matter physics and the physics of liquid helium.

The Pomeranchuk instability, the pomeron, and a few other phenomena in particle and condensed matter physics are named after him.

== Life and career ==
Pomeranchuk's mother was a medical doctor and his father a chemical engineer. The family moved from his birthplace, Warsaw, first to Rostov-on-Don in 1918 and then Donbas in the town of Rubizhne in 1923, where his father worked at a chemical plant. He graduated from school in 1927 and from a factory and workshop school in 1929. From 1929 to 1931, he also worked at a chemical plant. In 1931, he left for the Ivanovo Institute of Chemical Technology and then in 1932 joined the Department of Physics and Mechanics of the Leningrad Polytechnic Institute under Aleksandr Shalnikov, specializing in chemical physics and graduating in 1936. He had begun working at the Kharkiv Institute of Physics and Technology under Lev Landau the previous year, and remained a devoted collaborator with Landau. His first paper, in Nature, was published with Landau and Aleksandr Akhiezer, entitled 'Scattering of light by light'.

After Landau moved to the Kapitza institute in Moscow (to avoid arrest for comparing Stalinism to Nazism), Pomeranchuk also moved there, working for the tanning industry. He returned to Leningrad in 1938, lecturing, completing his Ph.D. and becoming employed as a junior scientist. He joined the Lebedev Institute of the Academy of Sciences of the Soviet Union in Moscow as a senior scientist in 1940. In 1941 the institute was evacuated to Kazan. Under Abram Alikhanov, he studied cosmic rays in Armenia from 1942. In 1943, he transferred to Laboratory No.2 under Igor Kurchatov as part of the Soviet project to develop nuclear weapons. Alikhanov founded Laboratory No.3 (which became the Institute for Theoretical and Experimental Physics (ITEP)) and Pomeranchuk worked there from 1946 (and for the rest of his life), founding and leading the Theoretical department, as well as being Professor of Theoretical Physics at the Moscow Mechanical Institute where students admired his infectious enthusiasm for his subject. Rudolf Peierls was consoled by the fact that it was "very clever Pomeranchuk" – and no-one else – who corrected his 1/T law for heat conduction in high-temperature condensed matter physics. His work in the 1940s was dominated by neutron research and his manuscript with Akhiezer was the basic guide for Soviet nuclear reactor construction. In 1950, he published a paper suggesting that the entropy of helium-3 as a liquid was less than as a solid. In 1950, Pomeranchuk received an order from Joseph Stalin to go to Arzamas-16, located in the closed city of Sarov, Nizhny Novgorod region, to work on Soviet nuclear weaponry. Missing his family and his 'hobby physics' problems, he was advised not to apply for a revocation but wait until the order was "forgotten". He returned to ITEP within a year. He continued enthusiastically with work on quantum field theory and S-matrix theory, particle collisions and Regge theory, the latter in vigorous collaboration with Vladimir Gribov. His last paper on Regge theory was published posthumously. For his work, Pomeranchuk was twice awarded the Stalin Prize (1950, 1952). He was elected a corresponding member of the Academy of Sciences of the Soviet Union in 1953 and full member in 1964.

In 1965, he was diagnosed with cancer of the oesophagus and underwent surgery, chemotherapy and radiotherapy. Although it was too late for his own treatment, he arranged for physicists from ITEP and the scientific research town of Dubna (which he had visited many times) to work together and with radiologists to commence proton-beam therapy research. He continued to practice physics during this time but died the following year. The first medical proton beam began at ITEP in 1969.

== Awards and legacy ==
- 1950, 1952: Stalin Prize, Order of Lenin.

A number of phenomena bear his name:

- Pomeron: named after Pomeranchuk by Vladimir Gribov and indicating a particular trajectory in Regge theory (the name 'Pomeranchuk trajectory' was made at the suggestion of Murray Gell-Mann).
- Landau–Pomeranchuk–Migdal effect: a reduction in 'bremsstrahlung' and pair production in particle collisions.
- Pomeranchuk's theorem: compares particle and antiparticle collision cross sections.
- Pomeranchuk cooling: unique cooling of liquid helium-3 under pressure.
- Pomeranchuk instability: a deformation of a material's Fermi surface between interacting fermions.
- Pomeranchuk Prize: awarded from 1998 for outstanding work in theoretical physics.
