= NA63 experiment =

Particle physics experiment

The NA63 experiment aims to study the radiation process in strong electromagnetic fields. Located at CERN, in the North Area. It is a fixed-target experiment which uses the H4 secondary electron beams from the SPS, which are directed onto different targets. Those are made from a variety of elements, ranging from the relatively light carbon and silicon, through the heavier iron and tin to tungsten, gold and lead and are either amorphous or mono-crystals (made up of diamond for example).

This experiment is part of the SPS research programme and began taking data in 2010 with Mr Ulrik Ingerslev Uggerhoj as spokesperson.

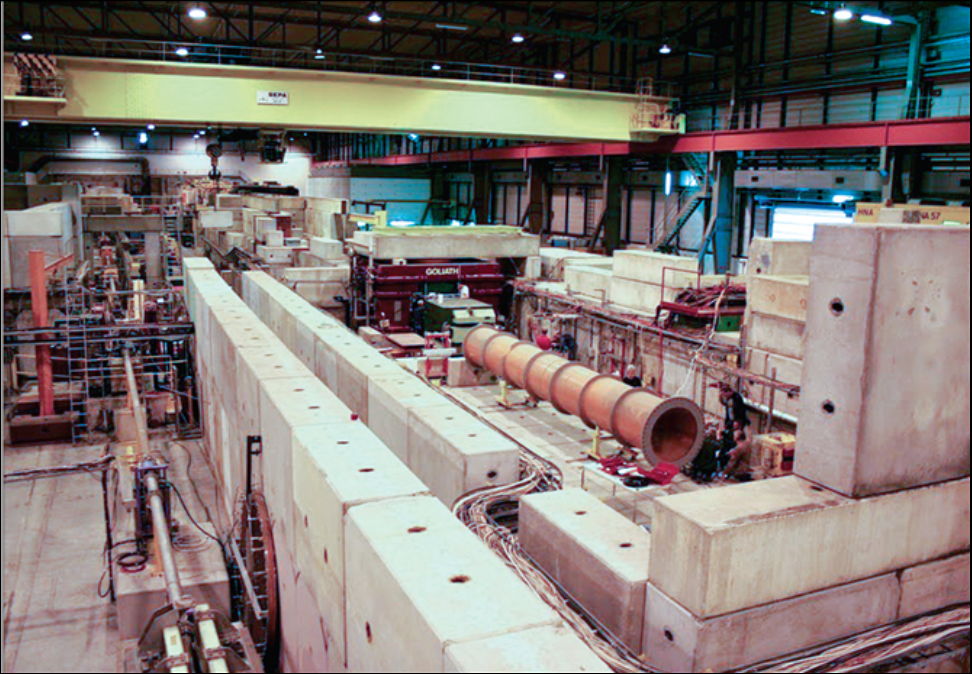
The NA63's experimental area.

== Critical fields in crystalline targets ==
One of the main objectives of NA63 is to study the trident "Klein-like" production. This phenomenon happens in very strong electromagnetic fields, when an electron in motion penetrates the field and emits an electron/positron pair. For this to happen, the field must be greater than the so-called critical field E0 = 1.32*10^16 V/cm-1, which is impossible to produce in a laboratory. However, in the case of crystalline targets, the penetrating particles experience an electromagnetic field close to that theoretical critical one. Indeed, if the electrons enter the crystal with a small angle of incidence to a crystallographic direction (axis or plane) in a single crystal, the electrical fields of its constituents add coherently, producing a total field around 10^11 V/cm which then has become continuous and macroscopic. If the crystal is rotated from an amorphous configuration, then in the rest frame of the electron, the nuclear fields add coherently in the motion direction and the total field can finally reach the sought 10^16 V/cm.

In such fields, an electron may gain an energy corresponding to the production of a new electron-positron pair, if it is transported over a distance given by the quantum mechanical uncertainty of its location : Δd= ƛ = ħ/mc. Thus, significant production of new particles is expected – and observed – once the field in the electron rest frame becomes critical.

Such fields are generally only seen in astrophysical phenomena, such as highly magnetized neutron stars, black holes (where it is the gravitational field that is strong instead of the electromagnetic field as in NA63) where the Hawking radiation is a close analogue and, perhaps, in the cosmic accelerators that give rise to cosmic rays of the highest known energies. Using a special approach employing crystalline targets and energetic beams from the SPS (~ 100GeV), NA63 has managed to test processes at such fields in the laboratory.

== Emission times ==
Another line of enquiry for NA63 is the effect of strong electromagnetic fields on the duration of the process of photon emission. Specifically, fields of a critical magnitude have an intriguing effect on how long it takes for an electron to emit a photon.

An electron entering an electric field is accelerated, and therefore must lose part of its energy in the form of a photon via the Bremsstrahlung effect - the process by which a charged particle emits electromagnetic radiation when being decelerated upon passing an atom, for instance in a solid material. By exploiting the relativistic phenomena of time dilatation and length contraction, the NA63 experiment has shown that this process of photon emission is not instantaneous, but rather, takes time. Because the process takes time, the photon production can be influenced experimentally. For non-relativistic particles this time is so short that investigations are very difficult, if not excluded. But for the relativistic particles used by NA63, their time is 'slowed' by a factor of about half a million due to the relativistic effect of time dilatation, making investigations possible.

In a critical electromagnetic field, on the contrary, electrons are deflected so violently that they don't have enough time to radiate photons. So adjusting the electromagnetic field past a critical level can modify the emerging radiation spectrum of a beam of electrons: increase the field and the relative radiation yield from the beam diminishes. NA63 is investigating such effects, and one of the main results shown so far is the measurement of quantum corrections to synchrotron radiation that is normally only observed in its classical form in a synchrotron (storage) ring.

== Radiation Reaction ==
Radiation reaction is a long-standing problem in electrodynamics. Briefly formulated it concerns the back-reaction of an emitted photon on the charged particle that emits it. In the classical theory, the solutions of the equations of motion lead to absurd consequences, e.g. conflicts with either energy conservation or causality. In the quantum version, the so-called Quantum electrodynamics (QED), the problem is in principle solved as the techniques required are known. However, the calculational difficulties involved are serious, and only comparatively simple problems have been solved. It turns out that strong fields is a route to addressing the problem experimentally, and (members of) the NA63 collaboration has paved the way theoretically as well as experimentally.

== Effects ==
The effects of strong fields and emission times are relevant in many other branches of physics, ranging from the so-called "bubble-regime" in plasma wakefields used for extremely high-gradient particle acceleration, through astrophysical objects such as magnetars (heavily magnetized neutron stars) to intense lasers and heavy-ion collisions. The concepts studied at NA63 even apply in a gravitational analogue – Hawking radiation from black holes – which remains to be detected. Finally, although a much 'cleaner' environment can be achieved with electron-laser interactions to address the problem of radiation reaction experimentally, lasers of sufficient intensity to enable thorough investigations are still some years, perhaps decades, ahead of us. With electron-crystal interactions, NA63 has addressed the problem experimentally already.

The Unruh effect might have been observed for the first time in the high energy channeling radiation explored by NA63.

== NA63 active collaboration members ==
1. Christian Flohr Nielsen (spokesperson): https://orcid.org/0000-0002-8763-780X
2. Ulrik Uggerhøj : http://orcid.org/0000-0002-8229-1512
3. Tobias Wistisen: https://orcid.org/0000-0001-8103-9860
4. Robert Holtzapple: http://orcid.org/0000-0003-2726-1131
5. Antonino Di Piazza: https://orcid.org/0000-0003-1018-0458
6. Simon H. Connell: http://orcid.org/0000-0001-6000-7245
7. Jens Bo Justesen: https://orcid.org/0000-0003-2525-6793
8. Allan H. Sørensen.
9. Mads Middelhede Lund https://orcid.org/0000-0001-9859-9506
10. Marc Breiner Sørensen
11. Sofie Jastrup Lanng
