= Aleksandr Akhiezer =

Aleksandr (Oleksandr) Akhiezer
- Олександр Ілліч Ахієзер
- Born: 31 October 1911; Cherykaw, now in Belarus
- Died: 4 May 2000 (aged 88); Kharkiv, Ukraine
- Education: Igor Sikorsky Kyiv Polytechnic Institute
- Occupations: Theoretical physicist, university lecturer, nuclear physicist
- Known for: Akhiezer mechanism
- Scientific career
- Doctoral advisor: Lev Landau
- Doctoral students: Mykola Shulga; Dmytro Volkov

Aleksandr (Oleksandr) Ilyich Akhiezer (Ukrainian: Олекса́ндр Іллі́ч Ахіє́зер, Russian: Алекса́ндр Ильи́ч Ахие́зер; 18 (31) October 1911 – 4 May 2000) was a Soviet and Ukrainian theoretical physicist, known for contributions to numerous branches of theoretical physics, including quantum electrodynamics, nuclear physics, solid state physics, quantum field theory, and the theory of plasma. He was the brother of the mathematician Naum Akhiezer.

== Biography ==
Akhiezer was born in Cherykaw, Russian Empire in what is now Mogilev Region, Belarus. He studied radio engineering at Kyiv Polytechnic Institute in 1929–34. From 1934, he worked at the Ukrainian Institute of Physics and Technology in Kharkiv. With Isaak Pomeranchuk and under the supervision of Lev Landau, he studied light-light scattering and was awarded a Ph.D. in 1936. A treatise on wave absorption in modulated quasiparticles gave him a habilitation degree in 1941 and title of full professor.

When Lev Landau left Kharkiv in 1937, Akhiezer became head of the department of Theoretical Physics at Ukrainian Institute of Physics and Technology, which was renamed Kharkiv Institute of Physics and Technology shortly afterwards. He held this post for over 60 years until his death.

With Cyril Sinelnikov and Anton K. Valter he founded the faculty of physics and technology at University of Kharkiv. With Isaak Pomeranchuk he studied neutron scattering and plasma physics at the Kurchatov nuclear physics institute in Moscow (1944–52).

== Awards ==
- 1949 L. I. Mandelshtam Prize of the Academy of Sciences of the Soviet Union
- 1986 State Prize of Ukrainian SSR in Science and Technology
- M.M.Bogolyubov Prize of National Academy of Sciences of Ukraine
- O.S. Davydov Prize of National Academy of Sciences of Ukraine
- 1998 Pomeranchuk Prize
- Order of Merit or Ukraine of 3d degree (1996) and 2nd degree (1999)

== Books ==
- First Russian book on nuclear reactions (1945)
- Akhiezer, A. I.; Berestetsky, V. B. (1953). Quantum Electrodynamics. U.S. Atomic Energy Commission.
- Landau, L. D; Akhiezer, A. I.; Lifshitz, E.M. (2013) [1965]. General Physics: Mechanics and Molecular Physics. Elsevier Science. ISBN 978-1483285184.
- Akhiezer, A. I.; Peletminskii, S. V.; Baryakhtar, V. G. (1968). Spin waves. North-Holland. ISBN 978-0429971440.
- Evolving physical picture of the world (1973 in Russian; updated version 1996 in English)
- Akhiezer, A. I.; ter Haar, D. (1975). Plasma Electrodynamics. Pergamon Press. ISBN 9780080180168.
- Physics of elementary particles (1979), Elementary Particles (1986) and Biography of elementary particles (1979). With Mikhail P. Rekalo.
- From quanta of light to colour quarks (1993). With Yu. P. Stepanovsky.
- Akhiezer, A. I.; Shulga, N.F. (1996). High Energy Electrodynamics in Matter. Taylor & Francis. ISBN 978-2884490146.
- Akhiezer, A. I.; Akhiezer, I. A.; Polovin, R. V.; Sitenko, A. G.; Stepanov, K.N.; ter Haar, D. (2017) [1975]. Plasma Electrodynamics. Volume 1: Linear Theory. Elsevier Science. ISBN 978-1483152158.
- Akhiezer, A. I.; Akhiezer, I. A.; Polovin, R. V.; Sitenko, A. G.; Stepanov, K.N. (2017) [1975]. Plasma Electrodynamics. Volume 2: Non-Linear Theory and Fluctuations. Elsevier Science. ISBN 978-1483148076.
