= Zenon Smiechowski =

Canadian decathlete (born 1955)

Personal information
- Born: Zenon Smiechowski; May 13, 1955 (age 71) Poland

Sport
- Sport: Athletics
- Event: Decathlon
Medal record
Representing Canada
Pan American Games
Bronze medal – third place	1979 San Juan	Decathlon

Zenon Smiechowski (born May 13, 1955) is a Canadian former athlete who specialised in decathlon.

Born in Poland, Smiechowski moved to Canada as a child in 1964, settling with his family in Grande Prairie, Alberta.

Smiechowski began competing seriously in athletics towards the end of high school and in 1975 became Canadian junior decathlon champion. He didn't get a chance to compete at the following year's Olympics in Montreal as the Canadian delegation opted to not send a decathlete. A Simon Fraser University varsity athlete, Smiechowski won the national senior decathlon title every year from 1976 to 1979. He finished in the bronze medal position at the 1979 Pan American Games in San Juan, behind Bobby Coffman and Tito Steiner.

From 1982 to 1998, Smiechowski was coach of Simon Fraser University's track & field and cross country programs, which he led to 10 NAIA national championships, having particular success in women's cross country.
