= Karl Anker Jørgensen =

Danish chemist

- Born: 15 June 1955 (age 71); Aarhus, Denmark
- Education: Aarhus University (BS, PhD)
- Known for: Research
- Scientific career
- Fields: Chemistry
- Workplaces: Aarhus University
- Website: www.groupjorgensen.com

Karl Anker Jørgensen (born 15 June 1955) is a Danish chemist whose research has focused on organic chemistry, particularly organocatalysis, asymmetric synthesis and stereoselective reaction design. He has been associated with the Department of Chemistry at Aarhus University where he has worked on catalytic methods for the preparation of chiral molecules.
