= Weng Kangqiang =

Chinese decathlete

Medal record

Men's athletics

Representing China

Asian Championships
Bronze medal – third place	1985 Jakarta	Decathlon

Weng Kangqiang (born 4 May 1959) is a Chinese former decathlete who competed in the 1984 Summer Olympics.
