= List of Taras Shevchenko National University of Kyiv people =

This is a list of notable students and faculty members associated with the Taras Shevchenko National University of Kyiv. Faculty members, scholars and scientists of Kyiv University have made a worthy contribution to the development of science, art and social-political thinking in Ukraine and abroad.

== Historians and philologists ==
- Volodymyr Antonovych
- O. Beletskiy
- Mykhailo Drahomanov
- Maryna Hrymych
- Mykola Kostomarov
- Ahatanhel Krymsky
- I. Luchytskiy
- Mykhaylo Maksymovych
- Lyudmila Pavlichenko
- V. Perets
- Yevgeny Tarle

== Journalists ==
- Valentyn Volodymyrovych Bugrym
- Hanna Homonai
- Andriy Shevchenko
- Roman Skrypin

== Lawyers ==
- O.A. Dzyubenko
- M. Ivanishev
- Abdul G. Koroma
- O. Kystyakovskiy
- Andriy Livytskyi
- K. Nevolin
- Vasily Nezabitovsky
- O.A. Shalimov
- M. Vladimirskiy-Budanov
- Mark Warshawsky

== Economists ==
- O.A. Dziubenko
- Igor Vladimirovich Litovchenko
- O.A. Shalimov
- Igor Yegorov
- M. Ziber

== Mathematicians ==
- M. Bogolyubov
- Boris Yakovlevich Bukreev
- Boris Delaunay
- I. Gikhman
- D. Grave
- L. Kaluznin
- Mikhail Kravchuk
- Nikolay Mitrofanovich Krylov
- Y. Petunin
- Naum Z. Shor
- Anatoliy Skorokhod
- Mykhailo Vaschenko-Zakharchenko
- Myhailo Yadrenko
- V. Yermakov

== Architects ==
- Alexander Yusuf

== Specialists in mechanics ==
- I. Rakhmaninov
- H. Suslov
- P. Voronets

== Physicists ==
- M. Avenarius
- Nikolay Bogolyubov
- Y. I. Kosonogov
- Vadim Lashkaryov
- Naum Davydovich Morgulis
- Solomon Isaakovich Pekar
- Emmanuel Rashba
- Nicolas Rashevsky
- M. Shiller
- Kirill Borisovich Tolpygo
- Yuri G. Zdesenko

== Chemists ==
- A. Babko
- A. Holub
- A. Kipriakov
- Sergei Nikolaevich Reformatskii
- V. Skopenko

== Geologists ==
- M. Andrusov
- V. Chirvinskiy
- K. Feofilaktov
- P. Tutkovskiy

== Botanists ==
- Aleksandr Vasiljevich Fomin (1869-1953)

== Zoologists ==
- Karl Kessler
- O. Korotnev
- O. Kovalevskiy
- O. Severtsov

== Medicine ==
- Fedor Bogatyrchuk

== Literature ==
- Yusif Vazirov (Chamanzaminli) (1887–1943), Azerbaijani, graduated in 1916; author of novel Ali and Nino (1937) published under the pseudonym of Kurban Said
- Viktor Petrov (1894–1969), existentialist writer
- Maksym Rylsky (1895–1964), poet
- Mykhailo Starytskiy (1840–1904), writer
- Oksana Zabuzhko (born 1960), poet

== Music ==
- Mykola Lysenko

== Politicians and activists ==
- Olga Bodnar
- Volodymyr Chemerys
- Büdragchaagiin Dash-Yondon, Mongolia
- Grigory Gershuni
- Vitali Klitschko
- Vyacheslav Kyrylenko
- Yulia Marushevska, narrator of the 2014 video I Am a Ukrainian
- Amina Mohamed
- Yuriy Pavlenko
- Rufet Quliyev, Member of Parliament of Azerbaijan
