= Halyna Puchkivska =

Physicist

Halyna Oleksandrivna Puchkivska
- Галина Олександрівна Пучківська
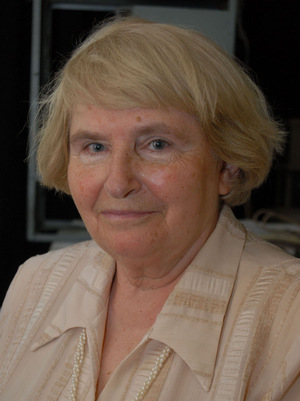
- Born: Kyiv, Ukraine
- Died: Kyiv, Ukraine
- Citizenship: Soviet Union → Ukraine
- Education: Doctor of Physical and Mathematical Sciences
- Awards: State Prize of Ukraine in Science and Technology
- Scientific career
- Fields: physics
- Workplaces: Institute of Physics of NAS of Ukraine

Halyna Oleksandrivna Puchkivska (June 22, 1934 – September 29, 2010) was a Soviet and Ukrainian physicist, a professor of the National Academy of Sciences of Ukraine (since 1989), an Honored Worker of Science and Technology of Ukraine (2004), a pupil of the famous physicist Antonina Prikhot'ko, a daughter of O. M. Puchkivsky (from the second marriage), and a younger sister of Nadiya Puchkivska.

== Biography ==
Puchkivska was born in Kyiv.

In 1952, she graduated from the Taras Shevchenko National University of Kyiv, then worked as an engineer at the NASU Institute of Physics. In 1964, she defended her dissertation. From 1993 to 2010, after the death of M. T. Shpak, she headed the Department of Photoactivity of the Institute of Physics of the National Academy of Sciences of Ukraine.

Puchkivska developed a method for determining the parameters of hydrogen bonds in crystals. She participated in the creation and was the main organizer of the International School-Seminar, "Spectroscopy of Molecules and Crystals" (which is now named after her).

The main works of Puchkivska are devoted to the problems of spectroscopy of molecules and crystals (about 300 works).

She died in Kyiv on September 29, 2010, and was buried in Lukianivske Cemetery next to her father.

== Awards and titles ==
- Jubilee Medal "In Commemoration of the 100th Anniversary of the Birth of Vladimir Ilyich Lenin": "For Valiant Labour" (1970).
- State Prize of Ukraine in Science and Technology (1984).
- Corresponding Member of the European Academy of Sciences, Arts and Literature (Paris).
- Prize of the National Academy of Sciences of Ukraine named after Antonina Prikhot'ko (2006).

== Selected scientific works ==
- IR spectroscopy of molecular crystals with hydrogen bonds, Kyiv, 1989 (co-author)
- Optical manifestations of conformational mobility of H-alkanoates of cholesterol (in Russian) (co-author)
