= Grigory Sarkisovich Grigoryants =

Soviet surgeon

Dr. Grigory Sarkisovich Grigoryants
- Dr. G. S. Grigoryants
- Born: 10 August 1919; Martuni, Republic of Artsakh
- Died: 3 January 1982 (aged 62); Namangan, Uzbek SSR, Soviet Union
- Occupation: Surgeon
- Spouse: Eva Mikhailovna Abramyants (until death)
- Parent(s): Sarkis Grigoryants - father, Eghineh (Elena Hairapetovna) Grigoryants - mother

Grigory Sarkisovich Grigoryants (Armenian: Գրիգոր Սարգիսի Գրիգորյանց; Russian: Григорий Саркисович Григорьянц;Cyrillic Uzbek: Григорий Саркисович Григорьянц) (August 10, 1919 – January 3, 1982) was a Soviet surgeon, an innovator and State recognized Doctor Emeritus of the Uzbek SSR He is best known for revolutionizing and developing medical surgical services in the Namangan Region.

== Early life ==
Grigoryants was born in the town of Martuni, Republic of Artsakh, to the Armenian parents. His father, Sarkis, who was a young migrant worker in the city of Andizhan, Uzbekistan, died two months before Grigory's birth. Grigory's mother, Eghineh (or Elena), relocated the family from their home in Gishi to the city of Namangan, Uzbekistan, where she had relatives. Elena and her two small children moved into a tiny upstairs room located in the same building as their relatives.

In Namangan, Elena provided for her family by working as a Washerwoman, cleaning homes and scrubbing floors. When they were not in school, little Grisha and his older sister Zhenya helped their mother out with her work.

At age 10, Grigoryants was diagnosed with an inborn heart defect and a Cardiac dysrhythmia. Elena was warned by the observing physician that the boy would not live long.

Grigoryants proved to be a quick learner. Aside from his native Armenian, the boy quickly became proficient in Russian and Uzbek.

Grigoryants made friends easily. His classmates and childhood comrades remembered the times the future doctor protected school kids from the bullies, pulled on girls' hair and disrupted boring classes by tossing rags on the classroom chandeliers.

After graduating from a standard Soviet middle school, Grigoryants briefly volunteered as a chaperone and translator for the Uzbek only speaking youth aspiring to be admitted into Samarkand Medical School (where teaching was in Russian).

During one of the sessions, Grigory, who was patiently sitting in the lobby waiting for his group to finish their exams so that he could escort them back to Namangan, a medical school professor advised Grigory to consider becoming a doctor himself. Grigory heeded the advice and in 1937, he was accepted into the Samarkand Medical Institute.

During the summers of 1940 and 1941, Grigoryants became director of the HealthCare Providers' Division within the Namangan Regional Health Department.

At the onset of the Great Patriotic War, Grigoryants was rejected for the draft into a Soviet Army due to his eye defect.

In December 1941, Grigoryants graduated from Samarkand Medical Institute a fully qualified doctor.

== The war years ==
On January 5, 1942, during the difficult times of World War II, Grigory started his job as the head of the Regional Health Department of Turakurgan (one of the Districts of Uzbekistan located within the Namangan Province). Grigory, who held one of the top positions in his field, humbly took a daily route through the railroad tracks – that connected the train stations of the Namangan and Turakurgan cities – on foot.

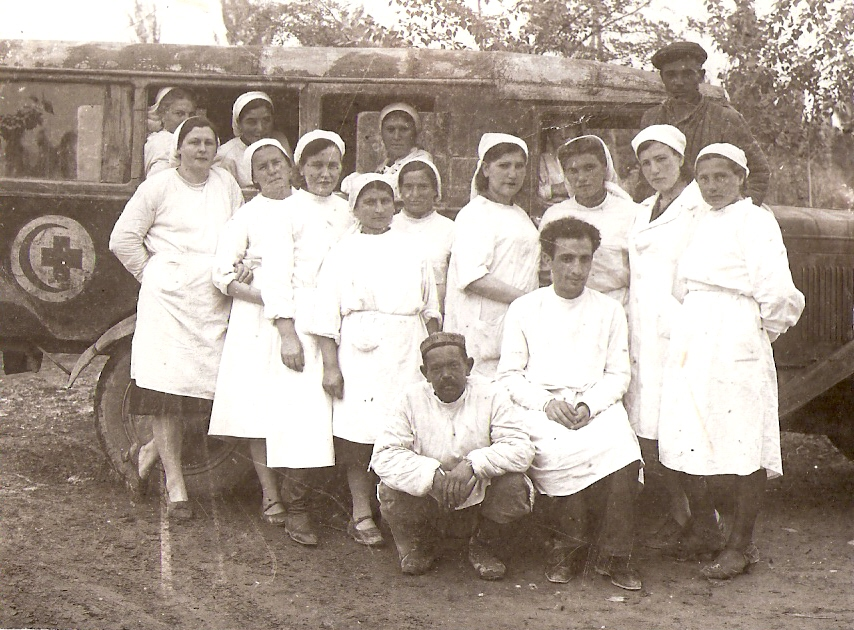
Young G. S. Grigoryants (seated center right) with the Namangan Evac. Hospital's #4567 staff, c. 1942

One year later, in February 1943, his governing duties expended as he became the head of the Namangan Province's Central Health Department. At the same time, Grigoryants also served as the Medical Superintendent and Head Physician of the regional evacuation hospital #4567, one of the 113 war hospitals set up in the Uzbek Republic during World War II. At that time, Uzbekistan, as other Central Asian Soviet Republics, served as the U.S.S.R's Rear (military) base.

Grigoryants's evac. hospital was housed on site of Namangan's school #34, near the train station from where the wounded Soviet soldiers and other military personnel (transported straight from the battle fields) were rushed to the evacuation hospital facilities. Working around the clock, Grigoryants's medical team – which was experiencing shortage in qualified medical specialists, as well as in medical materials' supply – had to economize by reusing the thoroughly washed gauze bandages on numerous patients.

Shortage of surgeons in the Namangan Province during the war led Grigoryants to his calling. In 1942, literally in clinical emergency settings, Grigoryants started his surgical training under the mentorship of Xenia Sergeevna Kisselyova, a prominent surgeon from Moscow, who was stationed in Namangan as the result of the Great Soviet World War II Mobilization and Evacuation to Uzbek Soviet Socialist Republic. Dr. Kisselyova later remembered that when she first saw a young tall doctor, she took notice of his hands. "He (Grigoryants) had surgeon's hands. Being in charge, he was doing everything at the hospital, from medical to administrative services. I told him to start operating." From that moment, Grigoryants's fate was sealed. Surgeon Grigoryants and Surgeon Kisselyova, the latter returned to Moscow after the war, had developed and maintained a strong professional bond and a lifelong friendship.

For his outstanding work as a doctor during the war time, Grigoryants was awarded an official Governmental Gratitude Letter and the Medal "For the Victory over Germany in the Great Patriotic War 1941–1945".

In 1944 Grigoryants was appointed director of Namangan's Feldsher-Obstetrician School Of Medicine (eventually the school was developed into an accredited Medical College). One of his best students in school recollected that Grigoryants's pupils, especially ladies, "greatly adored young Grigoryants", the man who always managed to look at any situation with a sharp sense of humor.

Grigoryants's duties at school already coincided with his job as a surgeon in Namangan's municipal hospital.

== Post-war professional life ==
In February 1950, Grigoryants became the Head Surgeon of Namangan's Regional Health Department. Concurrently, Grigoryants also supervised the Namangan's Regional Hospital's surgical department.

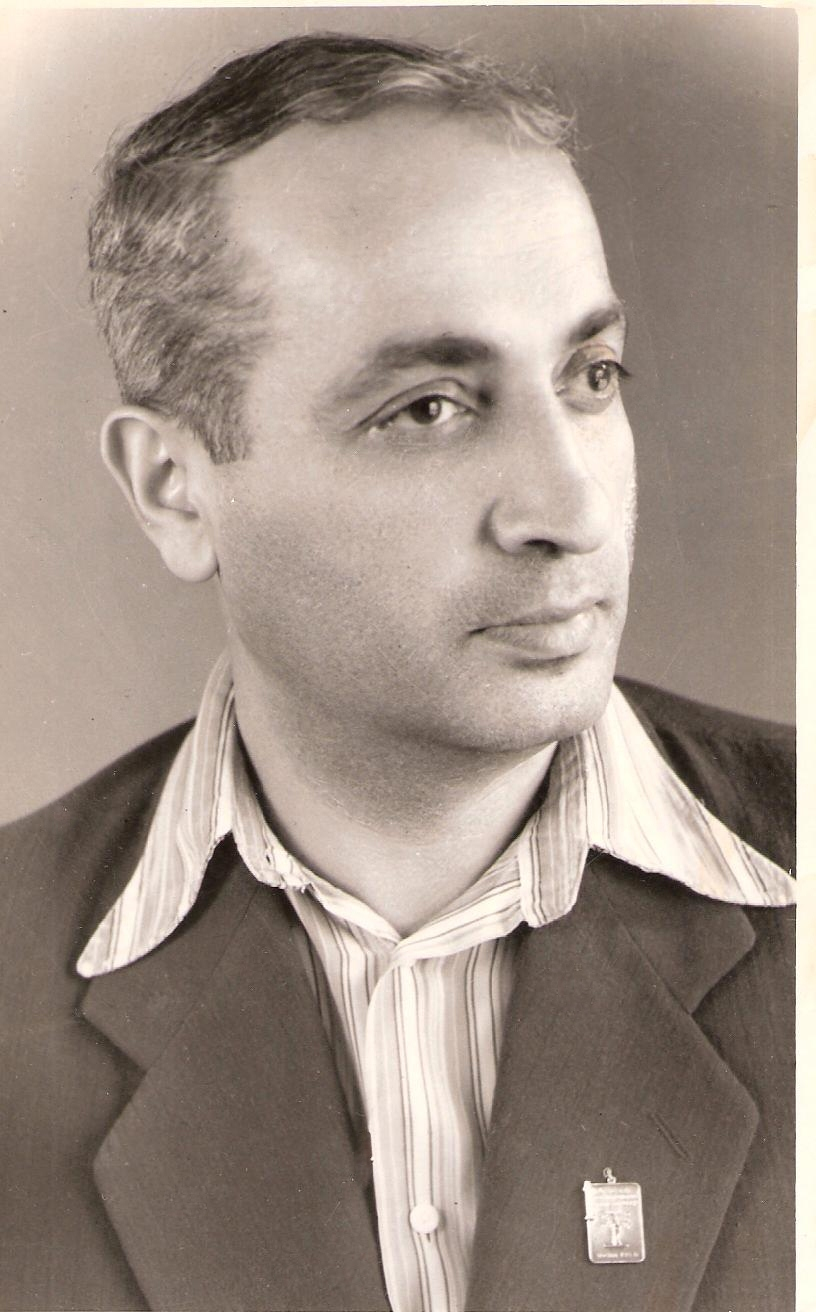
Doctor G. S. Grigoryants photographed at the 1st Conference of Traumotologists. Moscow, September 1963.

After ten years of service, in February 1960, Grigoryants was appointed head surgeon of the Namanagan City's Regional Hospital's surgical wing.

Grigoryants's scope of surgical practice was boundless. The doctor performed, with equal success, all types of surgeries ranging from gynecological procedures and open heart operation to Neurosurgery. Feeling personally responsible for every operation administered at his facilities, Grigoryants perfected his skills even in the art of plastic surgery by, successfully, reconstructing the skin tissues of the burn victims.

In July 1960, eager to learn plastic surgery, Grigoryants traveled to Mariánské Lázně and Prague, where he was invited to participate in the First International Plastic Surgery Symposium.

Inspired by the Health Care System he had observed, in Czechoslovakia and Russia (where he participated in the First Conference of Traumatologists in Moscow, in September 1963), Doctor Grigoryants returned to Uzbekistan with a goal to remodel the Regional Hospital's surgical department.

The architectural design, although in some parts created by Grigoryants himself, was to be modeled after the best European, mostly Moscow-based hospitals. The construction process was Grigoryants's love child which "he personally agonized over, approved, persuaded and the construction was administered under his rigorous control." On numerous occasions, Grigoryants had to fly to a Soviet capital to get the design blueprints for the surgical clinic approved.

"Grigoryants was a colossal talent!" remembered one of the people who lived in Namangan at that time. "What an Individual he was! I can only imagine what armor he needed in order to perforate the routine of those years! And he perforated it."

After a long construction process – during which Grigoryants had to overcome the red tape obstacles – a brand new surgical department was unveiled to the public. Stocked with technological, medical equipment to date'/ ordered by Grigoryants directly from Moscow, the new two-story complex was surrounded by decorated fruit gardens, three level statue-bounding cascade fountains and wide alleys filled with colorful flowers and shades from the various types of trees.

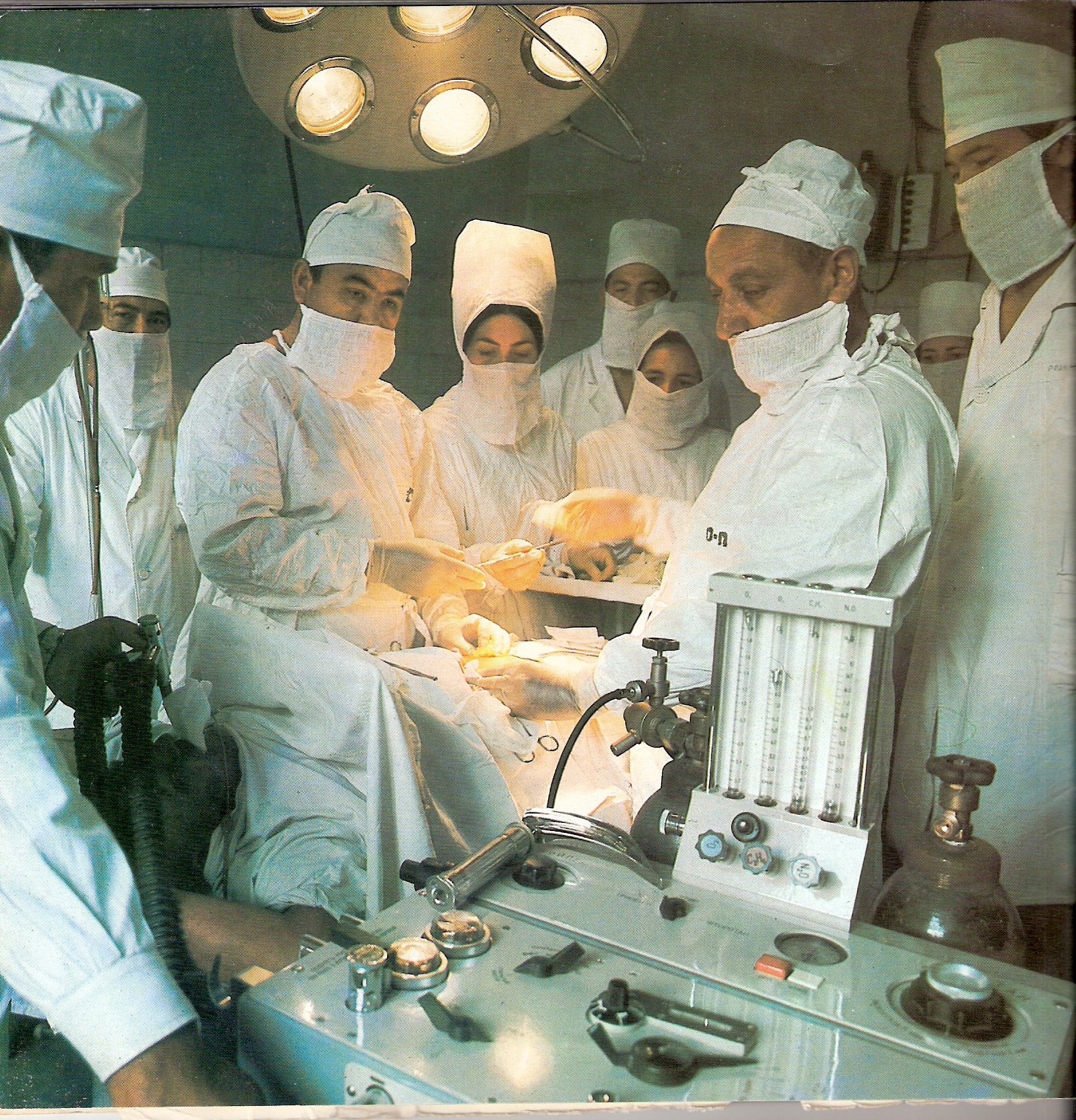
Doctor G. S. Grigoryants (center right) and his surgical team performing an operation. The Head Surgeon built a superb group of medical professionals that consisted of mostly his best and brightest students. This image also appeared in Soviet Uzbekistan magazine as well as in Namangan Region booklet.

The entire idea behind Grigoryants's vision was to make the patients and general visitors feel joyful and comfortable on the hospital premises. The new outfits were ordered for the doctors and the nurses. The visitors had to abide by the traditional rule of wearing snowy white hospital gowns inside the complex.

The overall neat appearance of the medical staff (who, according to one of the patients "admired and worshiped" their strict Head Surgeon), as well as their professionalism had rightfully placed Grigoryants's surgical headquarters in the ranks of one of the best in the Nation. One of the observers describes the surgical complex facilities of that time as the state of "cleanliness, order, even if one really wanted to find a spot of dirt, one wouldn't be able to."

During the routine daily rounds around the clinic, Grigoryants spoke to each hospitalized individual and held every member of medical personnel accountable for the slightest disobedience towards an established protocol of giving the best medical care to all patients.

Additionally, Grigoryants established an ongoing regional surgical training program for medical students at his facilities. It was the only hands-on program of its kind in the Uzbek Soviet Socialist Republic at the time, providing specialized clinical training under a senior surgeon. Through this program, Grigoryants mentored numerous prominent Uzbekistani surgeons, including B.C. Puck, A.A. Alinazarov, M.A. Abdulaev, and M.A. Ahadov, the latter of whom later served as a deputy of the Supreme Soviet of the Uzbek SSR.

The improved health care system was so successful that in 1974, the World Health Organization visited Namangan's Regional Hospital and Grigoryants's famed department of surgery.

In August 1979, Grigoryants semiretired to become the main consultant at the Regional Hospital # 2.

== Academic work and research ==
Grigoryants built a lever-operated gurney which made it easier for staff to lift the patients for the transport purposes. Due to post-war rehabilitation and slow economic growth in remote areas of the Soviet Union at the time, such rudimentary necessities were not yet in use in Namangan or its surrounding provincial areas at a time.

Grigoryants designed the operative technique of closure of the femoral hernia defect. Grigoryants is also credited with developing a method of musculo-aponeurotic surgical suture on the Abdominal cavity

Some of Grigoryants's research included work on surgical methods used in repairing damaged anterior abdominal wall hernias (also known as ventral hernias) and on the topic of radiological impairment the body sustains from the incorrect use of the x-ray machines.

Seeking to find the most effective ways to potentiate local anesthesia, Dr. Grigoryants and his colleagues tested the effectiveness of the unique ganglionic blocker mixture. The results of such research were published in one of the issues of Surgery, a popular medical journal published in the Russian SFSR.

Grigoryants is also known for designing a bromite solution that served as a post-surgical patients' sedation method. Maintaining a lifelong notion that, in most cases, prescription drugs should be kept at bay, Grigoryants frequently incorporated natural, organic healing methods into his medical practice.

Grigoryants designed a natural bentonite based clay mixture that he used, with a successful outcome, on patients who suffered from varicose veins, sanies, sores and trophic ulcers. Grigoryants treated some types of conditions with the self made combination containing skim milk and the lactobacillus acidophilus substances.

Believing that magnetized water is a natural healing component, Grigoryants designed a machine to function as a water magnetizer. He tested the use of this newly made device, with the intention of purifying drinking water on his dacha.

Grigoryants was not able to see the full capacity of his invention. At the time of his passing, some chemical labs of his region were testing the water sample that Grigoryants had collected from the Chatkal Range – originated mountain spring's flow on his dacha.

== Personal life ==
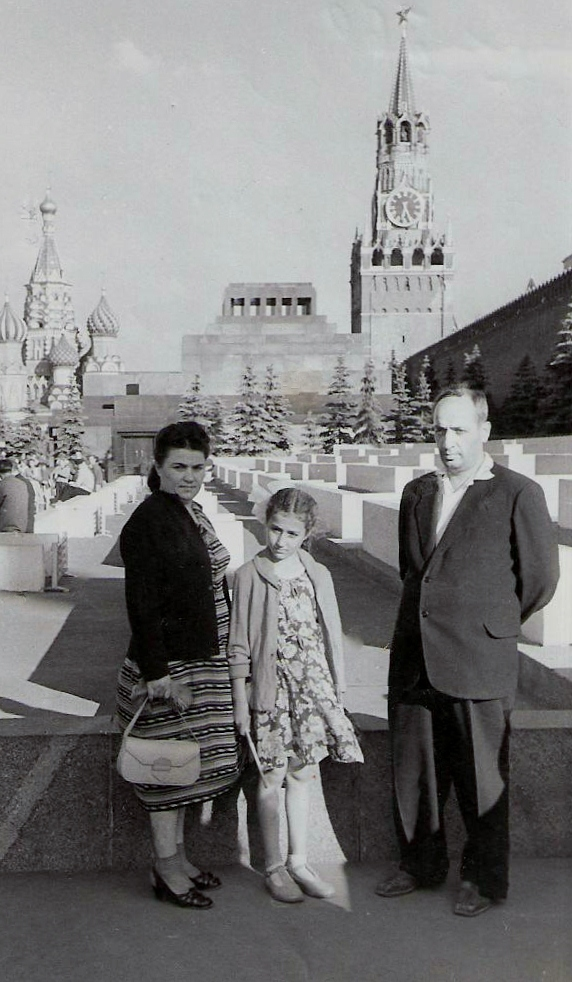
Rare vacation time: G.S. Grigoryants with wife and daughter in Moscow, circa. 1960.

In 1944, Grigoryants married Eva Mikhailovna Abramyants, a Russian Language and Literature pedagogue and a very influential person in her own right. The couple had four children: sons Ruben, Suren, Yuri and daughter Seda.

Grigoryants's Namangan house "81" on Ahumbabaev Street was known to every cab driver in town. With the backyard exit straight into the hospital's alley, Grigoryants's residence was a welcoming place that witnessed many guests, some of whom were the legendary dancer Tamara Khanum and famous accordion player Yuri Dranga (father of Pyotr Dranga), just to name a few.

The weekends and not-so-frequent times-off usually found Grigoryants camping with his family by the Lake Sary-Chelek (at Sary-Chelek Nature Reserve near the village of Arkyt), or vacationing on the surgeon's dacha that was located in the peaceful and sacred mountainous hamlet of Safed-Bulan, Ala-Buka District, North-Western part of Ferghana Valley.

Originally an isolated wetland of marshes that the local Government rendered to Grigoryants who, in turn, transformed the property into a green land with fields and gardens, the dacha was nicknamed "Zarkent" after the sunny village that was immediately bordering the hamlet. Surrounded by the rich green meadows and wild scenery, Grigoryants's favorite getaway stood on the banks of the Chanach-Sai River (one of the tributaries of Kara Darya and Syr Darya) that divides Uzbekistan and Kyrgyzstan.

Intentionally simple in design, with only takhta, a tent kitchen, a long wooden table with the benches and a retired train wagon that served as a tiny two-room bungalow, the "Zarkent" dacha welcomed many friends and relatives who often stayed for periods of time. An accomplished cook, a genetic trait he had inherited from his fraternal grandfather Hairapet Grigoryants, Grigory liked treating his family and guests to an authentic Uzbek pilaf, Manti (dumpling) dish and his signature homemade wine. The local villagers often came to Grigoryants to seek medical help, some wishing to simply talk to the doctor.

A big admirer of nature, Grigoryants built fruit gardens and planted flowers and vegetation on his dacha that was a delight to children and adults alike. In honor of his grandchildren, Grigoryants designed a special tree area and named each tree after his every grandchild.

Aside from gardening, Grigoryants loved listening to classical music, operettas (he knew most repertoires lyrics by heart), and reading scientific journals and books from his vast home library. His daughter, Seda, remembers how "dad would just take his favorite Chekhov book and read for hours".

In the summer of 1978, G.S. Grigoryants, who lived with the inborn heart defect, suffered two episodes of stroke that left him paralyzed and immovable. With the immense will power and rigorous exercise problem, Grigoryants learned to walk and speak again.

Grigoryants's remaining medical staff and colleagues hold retreats on Zarkent dacha. The gathering usually happens in the summer, on their mentor's Birthday.

== Death ==
Grigoryants died in his sleep in the early morning of January 3, 1982, due to complications from stroke the surgeon had suffered 3 years earlier.

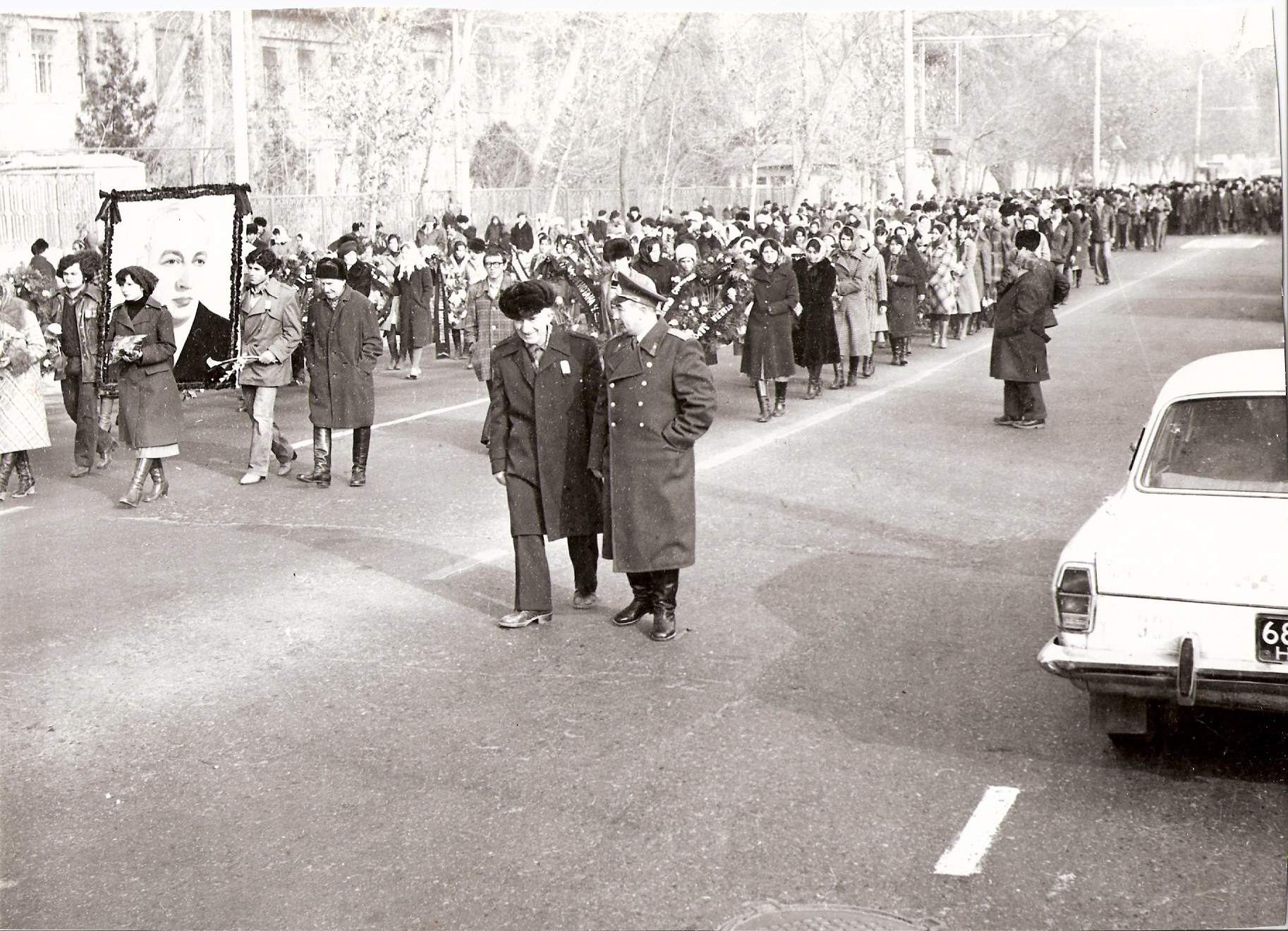
Funeral of Dr. Grigory Sarkisovich Grigoryants. Monday, January 4, 1982

Aside from the official death announcement in the Republic's newspapers, the news of Grigoryant's death was announced on public radio stations of Uzbekistan.

Grigoryants's passing was felt throughout the Soviet Union. Thousands of people attended the surgeon's funeral, some traveled to Namangan in groups on charter buses.

The medals Grigoryants had earned for his work were laid out on the small pillows and carried in front of the surgeon's portrait, which was painted overnight by a local young artist.

En route to Namangan's Central cemetery, the casket with the surgeon's body was taken through Grigoryants's beloved hospital, and the procession stopped in brief silence near the surgical wing. Throughout the doctor's final journey (5 kilometers around the entire city all the way to the cemetery), Grigoryants's coffin was carried by his sons and other men who stepped up in numbers ready to replace each other in this somber task. The traffic that day came to a halt as the people on the streets stood in silence and paid their homage to one of Republic's best physicians.

For some period of time after Grigoryants's death, people from outside of the city traveled to his Namangan home to pay their respects. Many people who did not know the doctor personally just wished to enter the house and pray. Grigoryants's family heeded the requests of the city's spiritual leaders by keeping the Doctor's house doors open for at nearly two months after the surgeon's death so that the mourners could have a chance to come in and grieve according to their cultural observance of mourning.

Grigoryants is survived by his 4 children, their spouses, 9 grandchildren and 6 great-grandchildren. His life partner, his wife, Eva, died in April 2003 in Los Angeles, California.

== Honors and medals ==
- Doctor Emeritus of the Uzbek SSR
- Order of the October Revolution
- Order of the Badge of Honour
- Order of the Red Banner of Labour
- Medal "For the Victory over Germany in the Great Patriotic War 1941–1945"
- Order of Labour Glory
- Medal "Veteran of Labour"
- Jubilee Medal "In Commemoration of the 100th Anniversary since the Birth of Vladimir Il'ich Lenin"
- Jubilee Medal "Twenty Years of Victory in the Great Patriotic War 1941-1945"

== See also ==
- Armenians in Uzbekistan
