= Khmeliv, Sumy Oblast =

Village in Sumy Oblast, Ukraine

Khmeliv Хмелів
- Village
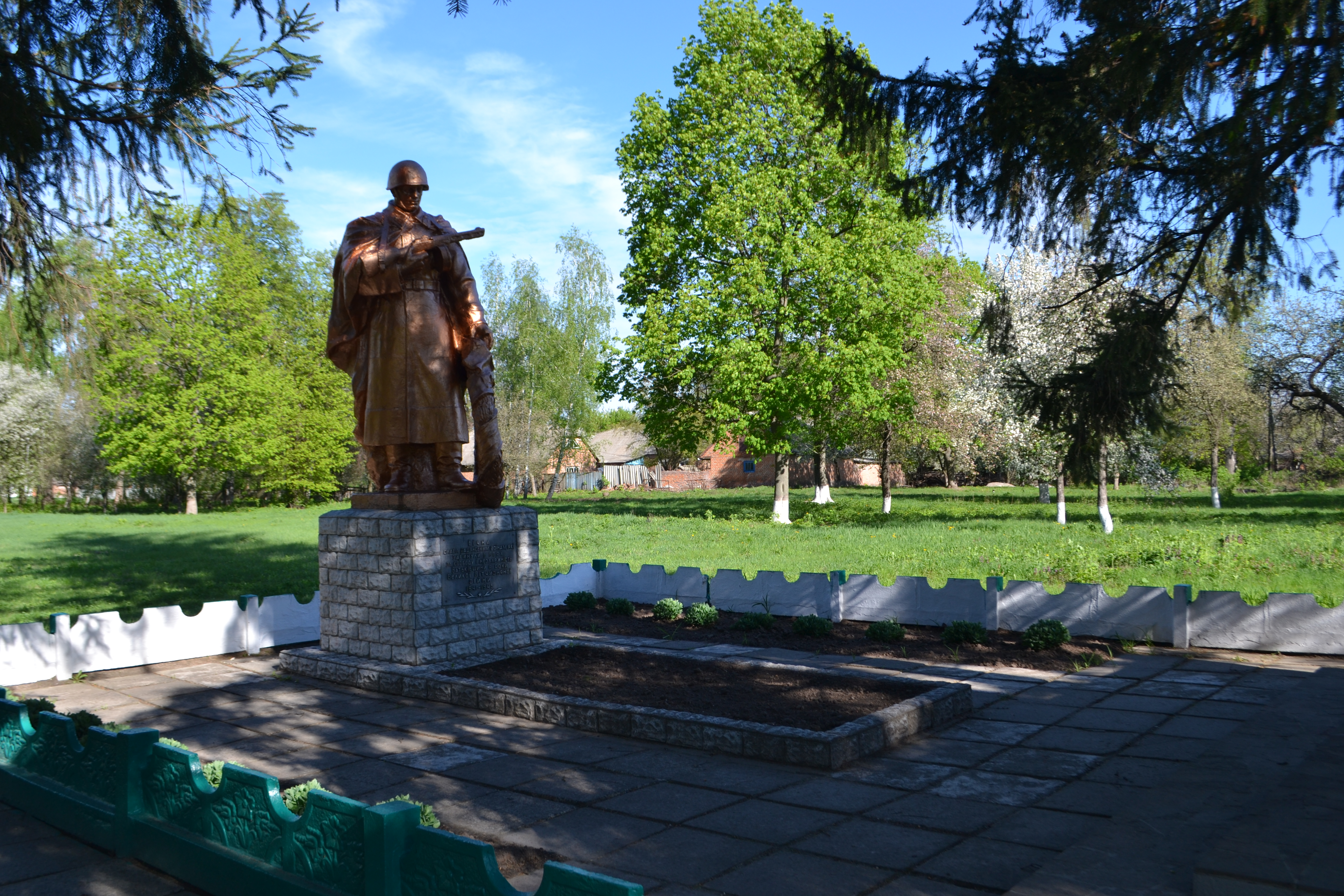
- Monument to Soviet soldiers of World War II in Khmeliv

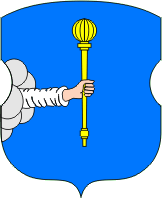
- Coat of arms

- Location of Khmeliv in Sumy Oblast Location of Khmeliv in Ukraine
- Coordinates: 50°53′25″N 33°29′09″E
- Country: Ukraine
- Oblast: Sumy Oblast
- Raion: Romny Raion
- Hromada: Khmeliv rural hromada
- First mentioned: 18th century

Population
  - Total: 1,540

Khmeliv (Ukrainian: Хмелів) is a village in Romny Raion, Sumy Oblast, in central Ukraine. It is the capital of Khmeliv rural hromada, one of the hromadas of Ukraine. It has a population of 1,540 (As of 2024).

== History ==
Khmeliv was first mentioned in the early 18th century. The village's inhabitants took part in the Russian Revolution of 1905, and the village was later occupied by the Red Army in January 1918. During the Holodomor, at least 160 residents of the village died.

During the German occupation in World War II, in 1943, the Germans operated a subcamp of the Dulag 102 prisoner-of-war camp in the village. 217 residents died during World War II.

Following the Russian invasion of Ukraine, Khmeliv took in refugees from other parts of Ukraine.

== Notable people ==
- Valentyn Bugrym, journalist.
- Volodymyr Fedko, economist.
- Vasyl Kalynovskyi, soldier.
- Petro Kharchenko, writer.
- Viktor Klymenko, hematologist.
- Andrii Kubakh, poet and journalist.
- Klyment Kvitka, musicologist and ethnographer.
- Mykola Olefir, oil and gas executive.
- Mykola Rokytianskyi, Ukrainian-American professor.
- Ivan Severyn, Hero of the Soviet Union.
- Petro Shkliarevych, aristocrat and politician.
- Ruslan Sulymenko, lieutenant of the Armed Forces of Ukraine.
- Petro Vovna, Hero of the Soviet Union.
- Sava Zerkal, Ukrainian independence activist.
