= Kulykivka Raion =

Former subdivision of Chernihiv Oblast, Ukraine

Kulykivka Raion Куликівський район
- Raion
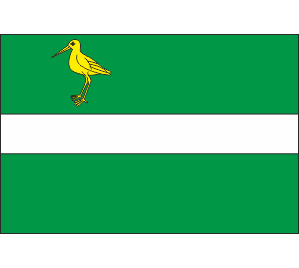
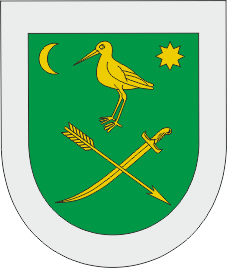
- Flag Coat of arms

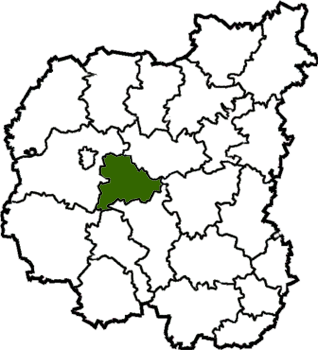
- Raion location in Chernihiv Oblast
- Coordinates: 51°20′55″N 31°39′12″E
- Country: Ukraine
- Oblast: Chernihiv Oblast
- Disestablished: 18 July 2020
- Admin. center: Kulykivka

Area
  - Total: 944 km^{2} (364 sq mi)

Population (2020)
  - Total: 15,730
  - Density: 16.7/km^{2} (43.2/sq mi)
- Time zone: UTC+2 (EET)
  - Summer (DST): UTC+3 (EEST)
- Website: http://www.kulykivka.org.ua/

Kulykivka Raion (Ukrainian: Куликівський район) was a raion (district) of Chernihiv Oblast, northern Ukraine. Its administrative centre was located at the urban-type settlement of Kulykivka. The raion was abolished on 18 July 2020 as part of the administrative reform of Ukraine, which reduced the number of raions of Chernihiv Oblast to five. The area of Kulykivka Raion was merged into Chernihiv Raion. The last estimate of the raion population was 15,730 (2020 est.)

At the time of disestablishment, the raion consisted of one hromada, Kulykivka settlement hromada with the administration in Kulykivka.
