= Byakov =

Byakov or Biakov (Russian: Бяков) is a Russian masculine surname, its feminine counterpart is Byakova or Biakova. It may refer to

- Dmitry Byakov (born 1978), Kazakhstani football midfielder
- Ivan Biakov (1944–2009), Soviet biathlete
- Lyudmila Byakova (born 1946), Russian seamstress
