= Solomon Pekar =

Ukrainian physicist (1917–1985)

- Born: Solomon Isakovych Pekar; 16 March 1917; Kyiv, Ukrainian People's Republic
- Died: 8 July 1985 (aged 68); Kyiv, Ukrainian SSR, Soviet Union
- Education: Taras Shevchenko National University of Kyiv
- Known for: Polaron theory, electron effective mass
- Scientific career
- Fields: Solid-state physics
- Notable students: M. F. Deigen, M. A. Krivoglaz, Y. E. Perlin, Kirill Tolpygo, I. M. Dykman, Emmanuel Rashba

Solomon Isakovych Pekar (Ukrainian: Соломон Ісакович Пекар; 16 March 1917 – 8 July 1985) was a Soviet theoretical physicist, born in Kyiv, Ukraine. He was a full Member of the Ukrainian Academy of Sciences and is known for his fundamental contributions to condensed matter physics, especially for introducing and advancing the concept of polaron as a charge carrier in solids.

== Career ==
In 1941, Pekar submitted his Candidate of Science thesis on nonlinear theory of semiconductor rectifiers for which he was awarded Doctor of Science Degree, this work was strongly approved by Lev Landau. In 1946, Pekar developed a concept of a polaron and coined this term. The model developed in this paper is macroscopic and based on electrostatic coupling of an electron to polar optical phonons. This coupling results in dressing of the electron by a cloud of virtual phonons and renormalization of its energy spectrum. In the strong coupling limit, polaron binding energy was found by Pekar, and its effective mass is described by the Landau-Pekar formula. While polaron moves freely across the crystal, a term self-trapping is sometimes used for forming polarons. Landau's original idea of trapping electrons by crystal lattice was based on producing by them color centers (F-centers) which consist of an electron tightly bound to a lattice defect rather than polarons as quasiparticles freely moving across the crystal and consisting of an electron dressed by a phonon cloud. Pekar’s macroscopic model of polarons became a field theory without singularities, and was afterwards applied to weak and intermediate electron-phonon coupling. Further generalizations included coupling of electrons to acoustic phonons and magnons, excitonic polarons, polarons in low-dimensional systems, and bipolarons. Methods of polaron theory were applied to the theory of optical spectra of impurity centers where the distribution of the intensities of phonon satellites is known as Pekarian. Concept of polarons and bipolarons penetrated also into the field of superconductivity, especially as applied to the phase transition between the BCS (Bardeen, Cooper, Schrieffer) and Bose-Einstein phases.

In his 1957 paper, Pekar advanced a theory of electromagnetic waves near exciton resonances currently known as polaritons. He predicted existence of new (additional, or Pekar) light waves due to a small effective mass of electronic excitons. Small mass translates into a large curvature of the polariton spectrum and additional roots for the momentum at a given wave frequency. Inclusion of the additional waves into the classical crystal optics requires additional boundary conditions onto the mechanical and electromagnetic components of polaritons. These waves were observed experimentally and certified as a discovery. An important prediction of Pekar's theory is violation of the Kramers–Kronig relations in polariton resonances because the real part of dielectric function is controlled by the oscillator strength of polariton transition (or the splitting between the upper and lower polariton branches) while the imaginary part of it by the decay of polaritons. This prediction of the theory is supported by the low-temperature spectrum of the first exciton-polariton band of naphthalene crystals. A phenomenological theory of additional waves has been developed in the framework of the crystal optics with spatial dispersion.

Pekar also proposed a mechanism of coupling between the electron’s orbital and spin degrees of freedom in crystals that originates from the spatial inhomogeneity of the magnetic field rather than from the semirelativistic Thomas term. This might be a macroscopically inhomogeneous field of ferromagnets that is already used for operating Electric dipole spin resonance (EDSR) in quantum dots. or a microscopically inhomogeneous magnetic field of antiferromagnets.

After WWII Pekar established a Chair in theoretical physics in the T. G. Shevchenko Kiev University and undergraduate and graduate programs in this field. In 1960, together with Vadim Lashkaryov, Pekar established in Kiev the Institute of Semiconductor Physics of the Ukrainian Academy of Sciences. This Academy awards the Pekar Prize in theoretical physics.

== Bibliography ==
- Pekar, S. I., Journ. of Physics USSR 10, 341 (1946).
- Pekar, S. I., (1951) Research in Electron Theory of Crystals (Moscow), English Edition: US AEC Transl. AEC-tr-555 (1963)
- Pekar, S. I., Zh. Eksp. Teor. Fiz. 33, 1022 (1957) [Sov. Phys. JETP 6, 785 (1958)]
- Pekar, S. I. (1982) Crystal Optics and Additional Light Waves (Naukova Dumka, Kiev) [in Russian]; English Edition: (1983) (Benjamin/Cummings, Mento Park, CA)

== See also ==
- Polariton
- Polaron
- NASU Institute of Physics
