= NASU Institute of Physics =

Research institute in Kyiv, Ukraine

Coordinates: 50.38642°N 30.52827°E

Institute of Physics
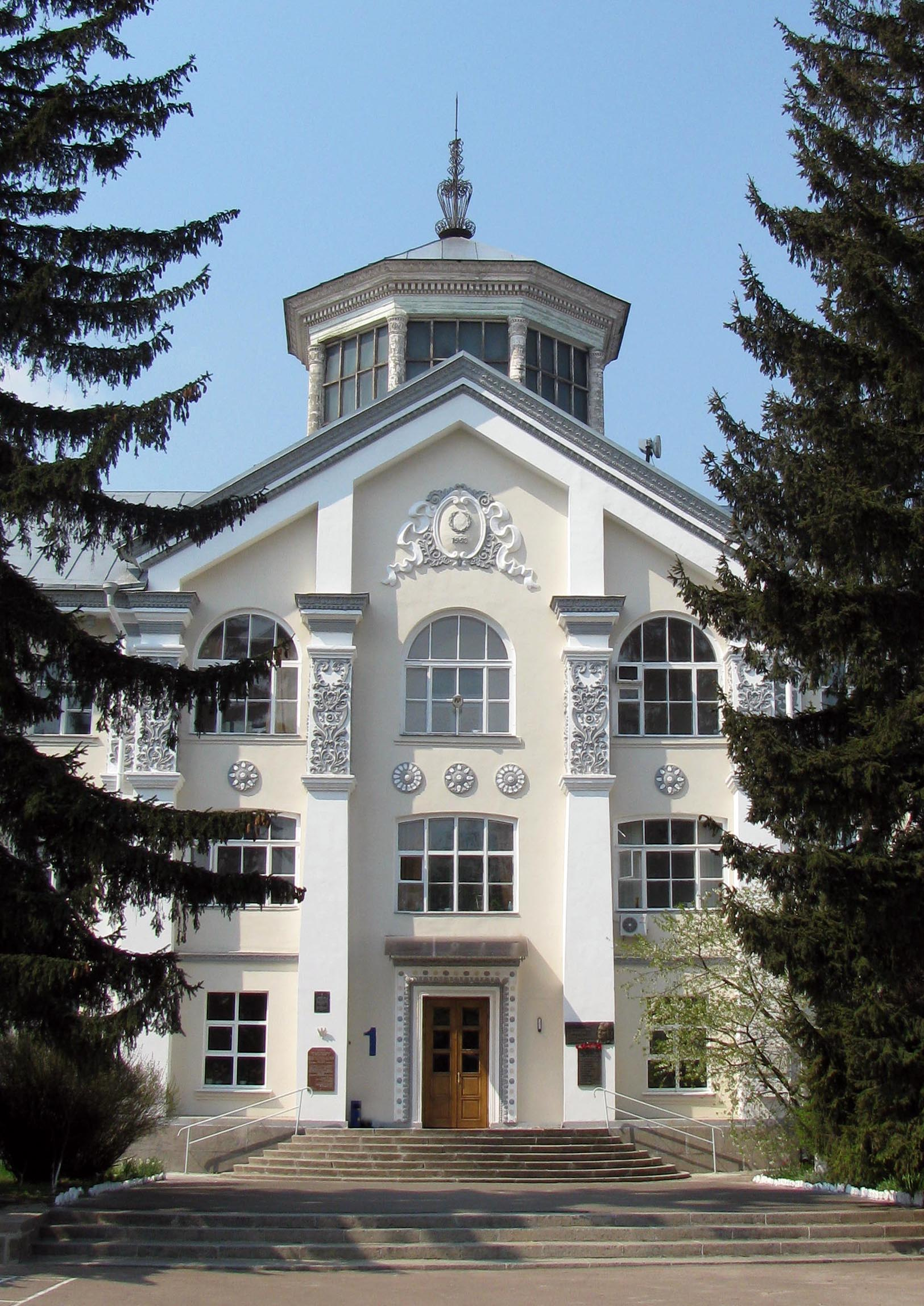
- The front entrance of Building #1
- Established: 1929
- Director: Mykhailo Vitaliyovych Bondar
- Staff: 500
- Address: 46, Nauky av., Kyiv, 03028 Ukraine
- Location: Kyiv, Ukraine
- Website: http://www.iop.kiev.ua/

The Institute of Physics (IOP) of the National Academy of Sciences of Ukraine (Ukrainian: Інститут фізики Національної академії наук України, romanized: Instytut fizyky Natsionalnoi akademii nauk Ukrainy) founded in 1926 is the oldest research institution of physical science within the academy. Being on the path of both infrastructure development and research diversification for more than 80 years, the institute has eventually originated five more specialized research institutions.

Currently, the institute employs more than 300 researchers (together with two full members and eight corresponding members of the NASU) and around 200 peoples of supporting personnel. It has more than 20 scientific units (including the state-of-the-art Femtosecond Laser Complex) which are grouped around four research programs

Traditionally, the institute is focused on fundamental research. At the same time, applied research on cryogenics, LC displays, laser systems, pyroelectric detectors, biophysics and plasma technologies strengthen the institute's activities.

The IOP is consistently ranked at the top of national academic institutions ranking. Besides, international reputation of IOP is growing constantly as prominent scientists from the Institute expand their activity to leading foreign research centers and universities.

== History ==
The origin of the Institute of Physics dates back to 1921, when the Kyiv Regional Department of Education established the Physics research laboratory. The following year, it was transformed into the Kyiv Science-Research Department of Physics at Kyiv Polytechnic Institute. The separate entity was established in 1929, when the department was transformed into the Science-Research Institute of Physics of the People's Commissariat of Education of the Ukrainian Soviet Socialist Republic. It was eventually renamed as the Institute of Physics of the National Academy of Sciences of Ukraine. In 2009, the institute celebrated its 80th anniversary.

Academician O.G. Goldman was the founder and the first director of the institute, which has 20 employees in 1929, including 6 scientists and 10 graduate students. In the first years of existence, the institute mainly focused on the training of young scientists and finding its own areas of specialization. Many people who successfully defended their PhD theses in that time then became famous scientists. Among them: academicians V.Ye. Lashkaryov, S.I. Pekar and V.P. Linnik, associate members of the Academy of Sciences N.D. Morgulis and P.G. Borzyak, doctors of science M.D. Gabovich, O.G. Miselyuk and others. In 1938, the institute has 3 major research specializations: Semiconductor physics (heads O.G. Goldman, V.Ye. Lashkaryov since 1939); Physics of electronic and electrovacuum processes (head N.D. Morgulis); X-ray physics of metals (head S.D. Gertsriken)

Before the Soviet Union was attacked by Germany in 1941, the institute employed 122 persons, including 36 scientists and 7 graduate students. The institute has also experimental workshops with qualified staff and state-of-the-art equipment. Ukrainian physical notes, a journal, was published between 1929 and 1936.

During World War II, the institute was relocated in Ufa. Academician A.I. Leipunskii (he was the director between 1943 and 1949) and professor G.D. Latyshev from Ukrainian Physical-Technical Institute entered its management team. The focus of the research is directed towards military applications.

After the war, the institute was quickly restored. In 1953, new buildings for laboratories, production and housing were brought into service on Nauky avenue near the Golosiyivskyi forest.

Some new areas of research activity were developed. Among them: nuclear physics (heads: A.I. Leipunskii and then M.V. Pasichnik), physics of crystals (academician A.F. Prikhot'ko), theoretical physics (academician O.S. Davydov and S.I. Pekar). Electrostatic generator, cyclotron laboratory, and nuclear reactor were put into operation in 1947, 1956, and 1960, correspondingly.

Some specialized research institutes originate from the Institute of Physics. In 1945, on the basis of Diffusion Process Department the Laboratory of Metal Physics was organized, which become the Institute of Metallophysics in 1955. On the basis of the Semiconductor Department, the Institute of Semiconductors was established in 1960. Then, the Institute for Theoretical Physics was established in 1966 from the Department of Elementary Particles. In 1970, some departments were transformed into the Institute for Nuclear Research of the Academy of Sciences of the USSR. And the Institute of Applied Optics was created on the basis of Optical Quantum Electronics Department.

As a result of such organizational transformations, many famous scientists moved to the new Institutions of the Academy of Sciences. But the Institute of Physics also developed significantly and did not lose its leadership. In the 1960s, new areas such quantum electronics, holography, nonlinear optics, pyroelectronics were developed. The Institute made significant contribution to some fields in physics, such as nuclear physics, semiconductor physics, solid state physics, liquid crystals, quantum electronics, plasma physics, and others. Its scientists received certificates for 5 discoveries – more than any other institution in Ukraine. Moreover, scientists of the institute were awarded the Lenin Prize, 4 State Prizes of the USSR, and 18 State Prizes of Ukraine in physics.

In 1979, the institute was awarded the Order of the Red Banner for its large-scale success in the development of physical science and training the highly qualified personnel.

Due to the unique architecture of the main building of the institute and painting on its dome made by honoured Ukrainian artist M.A. Storozhenko, the main building of the institute was recognized to have a significant historical value and listed among other monuments of architecture, history, and art.

== Directors ==
- 1921 — 1938 Oleksandr Goldman, in 1938 arrested exiled to Kazakhstan
- 1938 — 1941 O.Myselyuk
- 1941 — 1944 Yurii Pfeiffer, director of the joint institute of physics and mathematics
- 1944 — 1948 Aleksandr Leipunskii
- 1949 — 1965 Mitrofan Pasichnyk
- 1965 — 1970 Antonina Prikhot'ko
- 1970 — 1987 Marat Shpak
- 1987 — 2006 Mykhailo Brodyn
- 2006 — 2007 Ihor Soloshenko
- 2007 — 2018 Leonid Yatsenko
- 2018 — present Mykhailo Bondar

== Core research directions ==
=== Condensed matter and soft matter physics ===
The main focus is on the optical and spectroscopic investigations of composite materials, molecular crystals, semiconductors, and liquid crystals. The properties of excitons and other quasiparticles are also studied, as well as quantum-dimensional structures. Research interests extend to high-temperature superconductivity, magnetic phenomena such as magnetic resonance, magnetostriction, and magnetooptics, as well as optical and magnetic phenomena in semimagnetic semiconductors. Investigations of defects, both radiation and technological, in semiconductors are of high fundamental and practical importance, as well as developments of radiation techniques for machining semiconductor materials for microelectronics. Studies of biological systems, phototransformation in biomolecules, laser photochemistry and spectroscopy of biomolecules.

=== Nanophysics and nanoelectronics ===
Such investigations began in the middle of the 1960s, when the Physical Electronics Department started studying discontinuous films and discovered the effect of cold electronic emission from such structures. Now, most of the departments work with nanoscale systems to investigate their optical, magnetic, transport, and photoelectric properties. Research activity is also directed to improving the methods for synthesis of nanoscale objects.

=== Laser physics, nonlinear and singular optics, and holography ===
The institute continues investigating the physics gas lasers, solid-state lasers and dye lasers. Also, scientific interest expand to investigations of nonlinear optical phenomena in semiconductor crystals, molecular crystals and liquid crystals, photorefractive materials, polymers, organic molecules, and photopolymer materials for holography and information recording. Many research projects involve nonlinear laser spectroscopy with ultrahigh resolution, photoacoustic laser spectroscopy and microscopy, or aimed at creating new methods for laser manipulation of free atom particles. There are some traditional research areas, such as dynamic holography, multi-beam optics, speckle fields and holographic correlation methods for laser beam transformation. Also, new investigations in singular optics are conducted.

=== Surface physics, emission and plasma electronics ===
Investigations of small particles and their ensembles are conducted. Optical and emission properties of discontinuous films, physical phenomena in adsorbed films, gas and metal adsorption on solid state surfaces, electronic emission, atom structure and phase transitions in two-dimensional systems, characteristics of ordered thin-film molecular systems, solid state plasma phenomena, hot charge carriers and self-organization effects in semiconductors, and phonon transportation in semiconductors are studied.

Physics of ion-beam plasma, plasmodynamics and plasma kinetics are studied. Recently, new highly efficient plasma technologies and devices were created on the basis of fundamental investigations. They include high-current plasma lenses, devices for surface cleaning and coating, plasma sterilizers of medical equipment and materials.

== Scientific schools ==
=== Optics and spectroscopy of nonmetallic crystals ===
Research was established by A.F. Prihot'ko (1906–1991), Hero of Socialist Labor, laureate of the Lenin Prize, State Prize of Ukraine, and Honored Scientist of Ukraine. Significant contributions to the formation of the scientific school were made by M.S. Brodyn, V.L. Broude, M.S. Soskin, and M.T. Shpak. Modern investigations in the field are conducted under the leadership of M.S. Brodyn, M.S. Soskin, I.V. Blonsky, S.M. Ryabchenko, I.P. Gnatenko, M.V. Kuryk, G.A. Puchkovska, Y.A. Reznikov.

=== Nonlinear optics and laser physics ===
It was founded by students of A.F. Prihot'ko: academician Mykhailo S. Brodyn, laureate of the Lenin Prize and State Prize of the USSR, and Marat S. Soskin, who is a corresponding member of the academy and a laureate of the State Prize of the USSR. Modern investigations are conducted by M. S Brodyn, M.S. Soskin, S.G. Odoulov, L.P. Yatsenko, A.O. Borshch, M.V. Vasnetsov, A.M. Negriyko, Ye.O. Tikhonov.

=== Physical electronics ===
It was founded by the corresponding members of the Academy Naum D. Morgulis and Petr G. Borzyak. Modern scientific research is led by academician A.G. Naumovets, corresponding member of the Academy Yu.G. Ptushynskyi, O.G. Sarbei, B.A. Danilchenko, V.M. Poroshin.

=== Solid state physics ===
It was founded by academicians O.S. Davydov, a laureate of the Lenin Prize, and Solomon Isaakovich Pekar. Significant contributions were made by Kirill Borisovich Tolpygo, a correspondent member of the academy, and Emmanuel Rashba, laureate of the Lenin Prize. Their traditions are maintained by scientists under leadership of P.M. Tomchuk and E.A. Pashytskyi.

=== Physics of ion beams and ion sources ===
Founders are M.D. Gabovich and I.O. Soloshenko.

== Scientific discoveries ==
The institute has made five scientific discoveries that were registered in the USSR - more than any other Ukrainian academic institutions.

- Current-induced cold electron emission from discontinuous metal films

Certificate #31 (priority from 26 June 1963); P.G. Borzyak, O.G. Sarbey, R.D. Fedorovych

- Multiple splitting of non-degenerate molecular terms in crystals

Certificate #50 (priority from 1951); A.S. Davydov

- Multiple-meaning anisotropy of semiconductor crystal electroconductivity in intense electric fields

Certificate #294 (priority from 10 June 1971 for theoretical explanation and from 2 June 1980 for experimental evidence); O.G. Sarbey, Z.S. Gribnikov, V.V. Mitin, M. Ashe, K. Helmar

- The effect of complementary light waves (Pekar waves) transmission in crystals

Certificate #323 (priority from 23 May 1957); S.I. Pekar

- Combined resonance in crystals

Certificate #327 (priority from 7 October 1959); E.I. Rashba

== Technology transfer ==
The institute has developed many knowledge-intensive products which are based on the fundamental research.

Technology Transfer Office is the separate division of the institute created on April 15, 2008. Its mission is to protect intellectual properties belonging to the institute and support commercialization of promising R&D developments. Among the main tasks are the following:

- Implementation of modern approaches to management of both innovations and intellectual properties; collaboration with entrepreneurs and governments institutions of Ukraine and other countries for commercialization of intellectual property rights;
- Protection of intellectual property rights on domestic scientific intensive products, industrial models, trade marks, trade secrets, computer programs, data bases and other objects of intellectual property created in the Institute of Physics;
- Market research and patent investigations; support to licensing activity at the Institute of Physics; participation in international programs, grants and research projects for management improvement and strategic development of the Institute of Physics;
- Creation and maintenance of the database with systematized information about scientific developments of the Institute of Physics; presentation of the developments at local and international exhibitions for promoting commercialization of scientific developments;
- Involvement of young scientists into mainstream research activities in the Institute of Physics; popularization of physical science among students.

== Famous scientists ==
Since 1929, the institute employed many researchers famous for their contribution into both theoretical and applied physics. Especially in Soviet time, they were at the leading edge of scientific development. Now, many former employees of the institute work for leading research institutions throughout the world. Collaboration with them allows domestic scientists to effectively share ideas with universities and laboratories throughout the world and employ the best facilities for elaborated experiments.

- Antonina F. Prikhot'ko, a Hero of Socialist Labor, laureate of the Lenin Prize of the USSR, State Prize of Ukraine, and Honored Scientist of Ukraine. Her pioneering studies of low-temperature crystal spectra resulted in the discovery of excitons, for which she won the Lenin prize. This discovery received international recognition. During 1965–1970 years she was the director of the institute, and she remain the only women who took the office. Her contribution to the organization development is warmly appreciated even know because she established the most successful research departments and brought up many talented scientist, whose work later became internationally appreciated.
- Alexander S. Davydov, a laureate of the State Prize of the USSR. He is famous for predicting Davydov splitting, a phenomenon observed in molecular crystals due to intermolecular interaction when excitons can move from one group of molecules to another. He also developed the theory of absorption, scattering and dispersion of the light in molecular crystals, as well as phenomenological and quantum statistical theory of propagation of light through crystal which take into account spatial dispersion and processes of relaxation. He is also known for his work as the director of the Institute for Theoretical Physics of the Academy of Sciences between 1973 and 1988.
- Alexander I. Leipunskii, one of the pioneers of the nuclear research and nuclear industry in the USSR, a laureate of the Lenin Prize of the USSR, Hero of Socialist Labor, Order of the October Revolution, Order of the Badge of Honor and three Orders of Lenin. In 1933, at the age of 30, he became the director of the Kharkov Physical Technical Institute. In 1934 he studied at the Cavendish Laboratory famous for the fact that 29 Cavendish researchers have won Nobel prizes. Since 1939 he was the chief of a research program investigating the fission of uranium nuclei. Since 1950, he administered the project for creating the Soviet fast neutron reactor. Also, he was the director of the Institute of Physics in 1944–49.
- Solomon I. Pekar, a laureate of the State Prize of the Ukrainian SSR, was the first to describe the changes of the exciton energy spectrum due to coupling to light in terms of additional waves appearing in the crystal (1957). In 1946, he created a theory of adiabatic polarons; the term "polaron" came from him. He also developed a macroscopic model of electron self-trapping that was later incorporated into the following theories. He was the head of the Theoretical Physics Department of the Institute of Physics in 1944–1960.

== The structure of the institute ==
- Department of Adsorption Phenomena
- Department of Magnetic Phenomena Physics
- Department of Molecular Photoelectronics
- Department of Physics of Biological Systems
- Department of Physics of Radiation Processes
- Department of Physical Electronics
- Department of Photoactivity
- Department of Laser Spectroscopy
- Department of Optical Quantum Electronics
- Department of Nonlinear Optics
- Department of Photon Processes
- Department of Gas Electronics
- Department of Physics of Crystals
- Department of Radiation Sensors
- Department of Solid State Electronics
- Department of Optics and Spectroscopy of Crystals
- Department of Theoretical Physics
- Department of Coherent Quantum Optics
- Technology Transfer Office
  - Dynamic Holography Group
  - Cryogenics Technologies Laboratory
  - Laboratory of the Non-Perfect Crystals
  - Center for collective use of the "Femtosecond Laser Complex"
  - Scientific library
