= Myhailo Yadrenko =

- Born: 16 April 1932; Village of Drimailivka, Kulykivka district, Chernihiv region, Ukrainian SSR, Soviet Union
- Died: 28 September 2004 (aged 72); Kyiv, Ukraine
- Citizenship: Ukrainian
- Education: Kiev University (1955)
- Awards: Honored Personality of Science and Technology of Ukraine
- Scientific career
- Fields: Mathematics

Myhailo Yosypovych Yadrenko (Ukrainian: Михайло Йосипович Ядренко) was born April 16, 1932, in the village of Drimailivka (Kulykivka district, Chernihiv region, Ukraine) and died September 28, 2004, in Kyiv, Ukraine. Yadrenko was a prominent Ukrainian mathematician and pedagogue, Corresponding Member of the Ukrainian National Academy of Sciences, and head of the Department of Probability Theory and Mathematical Statistics at Kiev State University of Ukraine.

== Life and scientific activity ==
From 1950 to 1955, Yadrenko was a student at the Department of Mechanics and Mathematics at the Kiev University, where he attended lectures of prominent mathematicians and teachers such as N.N. Bogolyubov, B.V. Gnedenko, and I.I. Gikhman. Under their guidance, Yadrenko began his scientific studies and published his first scientific work devoted to the investigation of properties of random walks.

From 1955 to 1958, he was a postgraduate student at the Kiev University. In those years, Yadrenko began his studies of homogeneous and isotropic random fields. These investigations were presented in his candidate-degree thesis.

After postgraduate courses, Yadrenko worked at the Department of Mathematical Analysis and Probability Theory at the Kiev University. He devoted much energy to the development of mathematical education at secondary schools, organization of mathematical competitions, and publication of contemporary textbooks on elementary mathematics and combinatorial analysis and books of problems of mathematical competitions.

In 1966, Yadrenko became the head of the Department of Probability Theory and Mathematical Statistics, a position he held for more than 32 years. Under his guidance, the researchers of the department carried out research in the spectral theory of random fields (in particular, his doctoral-degree thesis, which is a Soviet doctorate, was devoted to this theory), asymptotic methods in probability theory, the theory of stochastic differential equations, and applied problems in probability theory and mathematical statistics. The Department of Probability Theory and Mathematical Statistics was repeatedly distinguished as the best department of Kiev University.

In 1970, the Probability Theory and Mathematical Statistics journal (Ukrainian: "Теорія ймовірностей та математична статистика") was founded on Yadrenko's initiative. This journal has played an important role in the development of the world-renowned Kiev school of probability theory. Since 1974, the journal is translated into English and is republished by the American Mathematical Society.

In 1969, Yadrenko founded another periodical edition, a collection of popular-science articles In the World of Mathematics (Ukrainian: "У світі математики"). In 1995, this periodical collection was transformed into a popular scientific, methodological, and historical journal. This journal is intended for a broad circle of readers interested in mathematics from schoolchildren to professional mathematicians.

As a scientist, Yadrenko is known for his works on the theory of random fields and their statistical analysis. He wrote more than 200 articles in this field, the majority of which were translated into English. A survey of the results obtained by Yadrenko in the theory of random fields can be found in the paper "On Yadrenko’s works in the theory of random fields". Yadrenko's monograph "Spectral Theory of Random Fields" became a handbook for experts in random fields. This book was awarded the Prize of Ukrainian Ministry of Education, and its English version was published in 1983 in the United States.

Yadrenko developed the spectral theory of homogeneous and isotropic random fields in Euclidean, Hilbert, and Lobachevskii spaces. These results were used by Yadrenko and his disciples for the solution of important problems of linear prediction and filtration of random fields. He founded the theory of Markov random fields, which represented a new direction in the theory of random fields. Later, the theory of Markov random fields was further developed in works related to problems of statistical physics and quantum field theory.

Yadrenko studied the analytic properties of choice functions of random fields. In particular, he established conditions for the continuity, analyticity, and quasianalyticity of random fields. Yadrenko also investigated problems of statistics of random fields. For example, he established conditions for the absolute continuity and singularity of measures that correspond to Gaussian random fields, and he developed efficient methods for the solution of statistical problems for random fields (problems of extrapolation, filtration, interpolation, and estimation of regression coefficients).

Yadrenko worked in various branches of applied probability theory, including optimal methods for quality control in mass production, statistical modeling of noises in semiconductors, statistical analysis of random number generators, statistical problems of reliability theory, and statistical models of distributions with random intensity.

For a series of works in the theory of random fields, Yadrenko was awarded the Krylov Prize of the Ukrainian National Academy of Sciences.

Yadrenko was the founder and the leader of a scientific school in random fields and stochastic processes. Among his disciples, there are 45 candidates of science. Ten of his disciples became doctors of sciences (Soviet doctorate): V.V. Anisimov (Corresponding Member of the Ukrainian National Academy of Sciences) and professors V. L. Girko, Yu. V. Kozachenko, O. I. Klesov, M. M. Leonenko, Yu. D. Popov, D. S. Sil'vestrov, N. M. Zinchenko, M. P. Moklyachuk, and A.B. Kachyns'kyi.

Yadrenko was a skilled teacher. His lectures were characterized by mathematical rigorousness, high scientific level, and clarity of presentation. Many Ukrainian experts in probability theory and mathematical statistics learned these branches of mathematics at his lectures. Yadrenko was the author of 24 textbooks on different branches of mathematics, including Probability Theory and Mathematical Statistics (Russian: "Теория вероятностей и математическая статистика") and an unparalleled book of problems in probability theory (written together with A. V. Skorokhod, A. Ya. Dorogovtsev, and D. S. Sil’vestrov), the English version of which was published in 1997 in the United States.

In 1995, for the first time in Ukraine, Yadrenko began to deliver lectures on actuarial mathematics and the theory of insurance risk. Together with his disciples M. M. Leonenko, Yu. S. Mishura, and V. M. Parkhomenko, Yadrenko published the first Ukrainian textbook on econometrics and contemporary financial and actuarial mathematics.

Yadrenko is one of the initiators of the introduction of the new mathematical study program "Statistics" in Ukraine. From 1997 to 2001, he headed the Statistical Aspects of Economics global international project within the framework of the TEMPUS-TACIS program of the European Community.

He also made tremendous contributions to the training of talented young mathematicians. For more than 40 years, he was an organizer of mathematical circles for scholars and school mathematical competitions at different levels. Since 1970, Yadrenko headed the jury of All-Ukrainian mathematical competitions for schoolchildren and students. He also headed the All-Ukrainian correspondence competitions in physics and mathematics, and for many years he delivered TV lectures on mathematics for schoolchildren.

In addition, Yadrenko was the Vice-President of the Ukrainian Mathematical Society, a member of the bureau of the Department of Mathematics at the Ukrainian National Academy of Sciences, the Editor-in-Chief of the Applied Statistics Actuarial and Financial Mathematics (Ukrainian: "Прикладна статистика, актуарна та фінансова математика") scientific journal, a deputy editor of the Theory of Probability and Mathematical Statistics (Ukrainian: "Теорія ймовірностей та математична статистика") journal, and a member of the Editorial Board of the Random Operators and Stochastic Equations international journal.

For his scientific and pedagogical activities, Yadrenko was awarded numerous medals. In particular, he was awarded the State Prize of Ukraine (2004).
