= Klyment Kvitka =

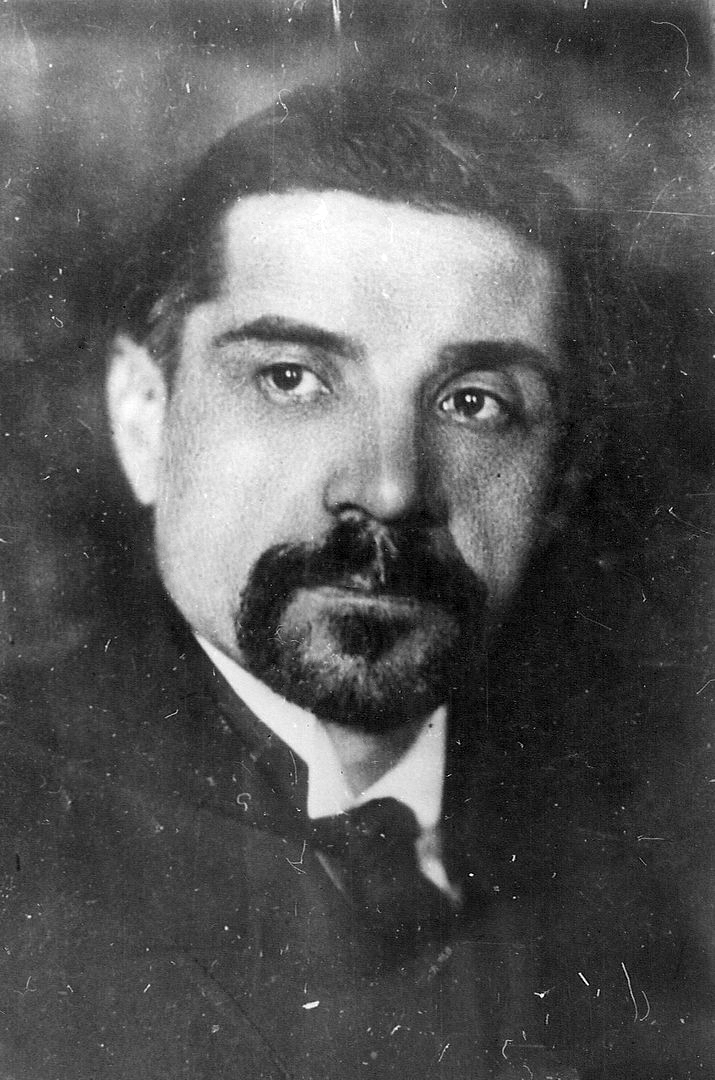
Klyment Kvitka in 1920

Klyment Vasilyovich Kvitka (Ukrainian: Климент Васильович Квітка; February 4 (O.S. January 23), 1880 – September 19, 1953) was a Ukrainian and Soviet musicologist, and ethnographer, best known as the husband of poet Lesya Ukrainka. Kvitka is renowned as one of the founders of Ukrainian musical ethnography.

== Biography ==
Klyment Kvitka was born in Khmeliv, Poltava Governorate (now Romny Raion, Sumy Oblast). In 1889-1897 he studied at a gymnasium in Kyiv and simultaneously attended lessons at a musical school. However, due to illness, Kvitka was unable to finish his musical studies. In 1902 he graduated from Kyiv University with a degree in law. During the following years he worked as a lawyer, spending some time in the Caucasus, as well as in the Ukrainian town of Chyhyryn, before returning to Kyiv. In 1918 Kvitka worked at the Ministry of Justice of the Ukrainian People's Republic. Under the Hetmanate he worked in a museum department at the Ministry of Education. Starting from 1918 he taught at the Mykola Lysenko Institute of Music and Drama.

Kvitka was a member of the Shevchenko Scientific Society, and between 1922 and 1933 served as head of the chair of musical ethnography at the Ukrainian Academy of Sciences. Due to government repression, starting from 1931 Kvitka was forced to stop his studies in Ukrainian villages, and spent some time in Moscow and Karaganda. In 1933 he settled in Moscow, where he worked as a pedagogue and led the ethnography department at the Institute of Musical Studies of Moscow Conservatory. In 1940 he was appointed lecturer of musical folklore at the establishment. During that period Kvitka's attention was dedicated to studies of organology.

During the Second World War Kvitka stayed in Moscow, continuing his work as a lecturer. He restored his contacts with the Academy of Sciences of Ukrainian SSR, which was at that time evacuated to Ufa, and after the war engaged in studies of Ukrainian and Belarusian folklore. He died in Moscow in 1953.

== Personal life ==
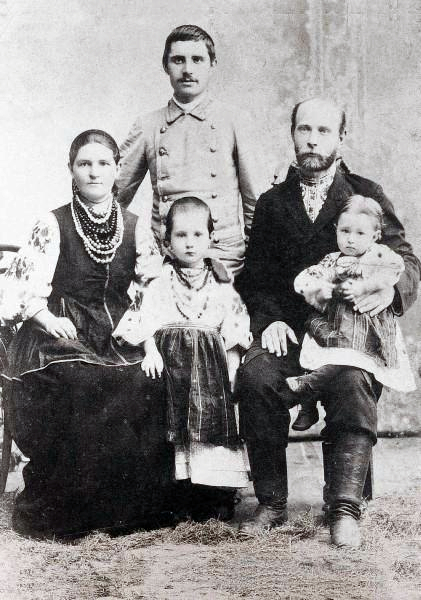
Klyment Kvitka with his sister's family

Kvitka first met Lesya Ukrainka in 1898. Their relationship became close in May 1901, after they stayed together in the village of Burkut. In July 1907, following the return from Crimea, where both had been undergoing treatment of tuberculosis, Kvitka married Lesya in Kyiv. One month after the marriage, the couple moved to Sevastopol, where Kvitka received a job at a local court. In late 1907 Kvitka received employment in Georgia, and Lesya followed him.

During the following years they lived in Telavi, where Kvitka worked as a bailiff. Due to his meager payment on the job, the couple's expenses had to be financed from Lesya's dowry. Kvitka's alleged adultery produced additional tensions in the relationship. In November 1909 Kvitka accompanied his wife on a trip to the Egyptian health resort of Helwan, but had to return one month later due to work reasons, leaving Lesya on her own.

Following Lesya's death, Kvitka entered several other relationships. According to Izydora Kosach-Borysova, in 1918, while working in Makiivka, he met the wife of a local factory engineer, who later gave birth to a son. In 1924-1925 Kvitka had a relationship with philologist Olena Kurylo. In 1945, at the age of 65, he married for a second time, to 25-year old conservatory student Galina Koshcheeva, who soon had a child from him.

== Work ==
Kvitka made his first records of folk songs from the regions of Chernihiv, Kyiv and Zhytomyr in 1896-1899; ten of the songs were published in 1902 arranged by Borys Yanovskyi. Throughout his career, Kvitka was also known under the pseudonyms Tymish Boreyko and Yukhym Boyko. In cooperation with his wife Lesya Ukrainka, he studied the folklore of Volhynia and Poltava regions. Kvitka became known as the author of numerous works on musical ethnography and studies on Ukrainian folk music. His main work, Ukrainian Folk Melodies (1922) encompasses 743 folk songs. Kvitka classified songs featured in his studies according to a certain topic shared by a number of compositions. Part of the folk songs were recorded from the voice of his wife. Kvitka also authored practical guides for folklorists and studied the creativity of traditional Ukrainian performers and lirnyks. He also published a book dedicated to the folklore legacy of Mykola Lysenko, as well as works on musical theory.

The Kvitka family played an important role in the initiative of the preservation of kobzar music by means of sound recording using the recently invented phonograph. Together with Lesya Ukrainka he helped organize the expedition of Filaret Kolessa, and co-authored the recording of duma performances by Hnat Honcharenko.

== Legacy ==
Kvitka's folkloric records were employed by composers Felix Blumenfeld, Pylyp Kozytskyi, Mykhailo Verykivskyi, Levko Revutskyi, Borys Liatoshynskyi, Yuliy Meitus and others.
