= Antonina Prykhotko =

Soviet physicist (1906-1995)

Antonina Fedorivna Prykhotko (Ukrainian: Антоніна Федорівна Прихотько; 26 April 1906, Pyatigorsk – 29 September 1995, Kyiv), was a Soviet and Ukrainian experimental physicist. She was an Academician of the National Academy of Sciences of Ukraine and is known for her fundamental contributions to the condensed matter spectroscopy.

== Career ==
Prykhotko was accepted to the Leningrad Polytechnical Institute in 1923 and graduated in 1929. Still as a Junior, she started research on spectroscopy under the supervision of Ivan V. Obreimov, and finally earned a PhD in this field under his guidance. In 1930, she moved to the newly established Kharkiv Institute of Physics and Technology for working with Obreimov on low-temperature spectroscopy of molecular crystals, a field pioneered by him, in the first in the USSR cryogenic laboratory created by Lev Shubnikov. This research was primary focused on comparing the spectra of vapors and crystals of weakly interacting molecules that at low temperature manifest a number of narrow bands due to the freezing-out the thermal motion of molecules. In this way Obreimov and Prykhotko investigated a wide class of inorganic and organic molecular crystals and detected optically low-temperature transitions between their different phases. The principal technical advances were in taking absorption spectra in polarized light and measuring dispersion, including the anomalous dispersion near the absorption lines, at low temperatures. During World War II, Prykhotko worked in the city of Ufa where a number of Institutions of the Ukrainian Academy of Sciences was evacuated. Since 1944 Prykhotko worked in Kyiv, in the Institute of Physics, where here husband, a prominent Soviet nuclear physicist Aleksandr Leipunskii, was appointed as a Director. There she established a Division of the Physics of Crystals.

The principal discovery of Prykhotko was published in her 1944 paper based on the experimental data collected still in Kharkov, and in her 1948 follow-up paper. She reported the discovery in the absorption spectra of monocrystals of naphthalene two new bands that were polarized along the symmetry axes of the crystal, as distinct from the majority of bands that there present in both components of the spectrum at the same frequencies. Because individual molecules in crystalline naphthalene are tilted with respect to the crystal axes, existence of strongly polarized absorption bands proved unambiguously that electronic excitation is not localized at individual molecules but propagates across the crystal. Prykhotko's discovery stimulated development of Davydov' theory of molecular excitons for crystals including several molecules in a unit cell. While existence of excitons was predicted by Yakov Frenkel and afterwards by Gregory Wannier and Nevill Francis Mott, Prykhotko's was the first convincing experimental discovery of excitons. The follow-up experiments on low-temperature spectra of benzine crystals confirmed agreement between the theory and experiment.

During the following years Prykhotko and her collaborators investigated spectra of a number of crystals, and her personal favorite has been crystalline oxygen where electronic excitations combine with magnetic ones.

Since 1965 Prykhotko served as a Director of the Institute of Physics of the National Academy of Sciences of Ukraine. She was awarded a Lenin Prize for her scientific achievements and a title of a Hero of Socialist Labour.

== See also ==
- Exciton
