= Leonid Yatsenko =

Ukrainian physicist (born 1954)

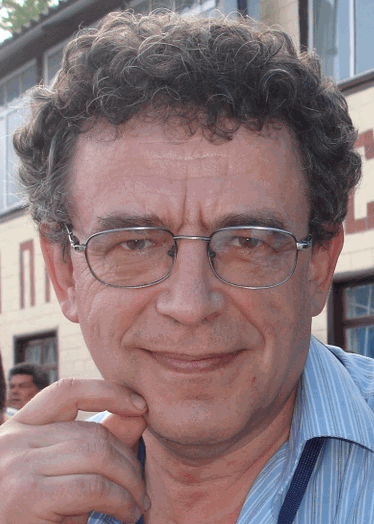

Director of The Institute of Physics of the National Academy of Science of Ukraine
- In office 2008–2018

Head of The National Research Foundation of Ukraine
- In office 2019–2022

Personal details
- Born: 25 April 1954 (age 72) Stepanovka, Zhytomyr region in Ukraine
- Profession: scientist, physicist

Yatenko Leonid (Ukrainian: Яценко Леонід Петрович; born 25 April 1954) is a Ukrainian physicist, professor, Doctor of Science, Director of The Institute of Physics of the National Academy of Science of Ukraine, Academician of the National Academy of Sciences of Ukraine, and Head of the National Research Foundation of Ukraine (from 6 March 2019).

== Biography ==
Leonid Yatsenko was born on 25 April 1954 in Stepanovka, Zhytomyr Oblast in Ukraine (then - one of the republics of the USSR). In 1970 he entered Kiev National Taras Shevchenko University, Radio physics department. In 1973 he was selected to be transferred to the Moscow Physical Engineering Institute, which he graduated with honors in 1976. Diploma thesis title: "Nonlinear power resonances in ring gas lasers". In 1980 obtained Ph.D. (Candidate of Sciences) at the Lebedev Physical Institute, Moscow, Russia, with the thesis "The theoretical investigation of macroscopical parameters influence on the characteristics of opticalfrequency standards". After that moved back to Kiev and started working at the Institute of Physics National Academy of Sciences of Ukraine. He's been working there since then and till present time. Married Elena Udovitscka on 11 August 1984. Daughter Julia was born on 17 July 1985. Daughter Olga was born on 28 October 1988. In 1993 obtained academical title of senior research fellow. In 1996 took a doctoral degree (doctor of science) with a thesis "Resonance phenomena in gas lasers". Since 1997 - leading research fellow of the Institute. Became Ukrainian State Prize Winner of 1998, which was awarded for the work on "Basic physics, development and creation of high-stable laser systems for metrology, analytical measurements and basic research". (see more on Honours and Awards) In 2001 obtained status of professor.1996–present time - various international visits and collaborations. (see Conferences and Collaborations) 2003, Munich - invited talk "Dynamics of Coherent Excitation of Atoms and Molecules: Basic Problems and Applications" at the CLEO/EUROPE-EQEC. Since 06.05.2006- Corresponding Member of the National Academy of Sciences of Ukraine. In 2008 was chosen to be director of Institute of Physics of the National Academy of Science of Ukraine. In 2015 he was elected as an Academician of the National Academy of Sciences of Ukraine. On 6 March 2019 the Cabinet of Ministers of Ukraine adopted the decision to appoint Academician Leonid Yatsenko, Head of the Coherent and Quantum Optics Department of the Institute of Physics of the NAS of Ukraine, as chairman of the National Research Foundation of Ukraine, elected to this position by the Scientific Council of the Foundation on 25 January 2019.

== Grants ==
Principal Investigator of several projects funded by the International Science Foundation, INTAS, the Science and Technology Centre in Ukraine, DFG, NATO–Scientific Affairs Division, and the State Foundation for Basic Research (Ukraine).

== Honours and awards ==
Ukrainian State Prize of 1998 Winner. The prize was awarded for the work on “Basic physics, development and creation of high-stable laser systems for metrology, analytical measurements and basic research”. The International Renaissance Foundation's contest “Scientists and Teachers” winner (1998).

== Teaching ==
Scientific advisor of three PhD dissertations. Currently scientific advisor of two PhD students and two diploma students. In 2002 presented of a series of lectures “Coherent effects in the interaction of light with atoms and molecules” to the Radio physics department of the Kyiv National Taras Shevchenko University.

== Publications ==
- Monograph (in co-authorship with Danileiko M.V.) “Resonance effects in gas ring lasers”, Naukova Dumka, Kyiv, 1994
- More than 110 scientific papers (among them 1 in Physical Review Letters and 11 in Physical Review A).
- 17 patents in the former USSR and of Ukraine.
