= Alexander Davydov (physicist) =

Soviet Ukrainian physicist (1912–1993)

Alexander Sergeevich Davydov
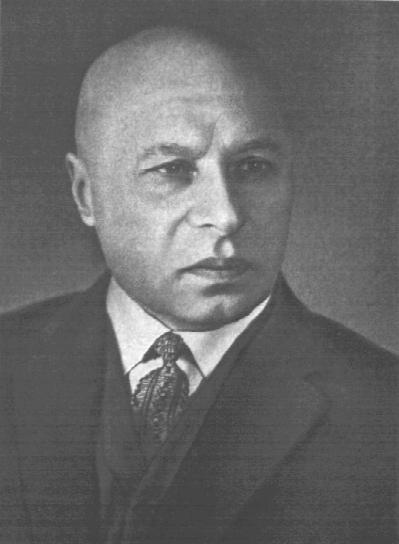
- Born: 26 December 1912; Yevpatoria, Russian Empire
- Died: 19 February 1993 (aged 80); Kiev, Ukraine
- Citizenship: Soviet Union; Ukraine
- Education: Moscow State University
- Known for: Davydov splitting Davydov soliton
- Awards: Hero of Socialist Labour (1982); Order of Lenin (1971, 1982); Shevchenko National Prize (1969); Lenin Prize (1966); Medal "For Labour Valour" (1961)
- Scientific career
- Fields: Theoretical Physics; Biophysics
- Workplaces: NASU Institute of Physics; Moscow State University

Alexander Sergeevich Davydov (Russian: Александр Сергеевич Давы́дов, Ukrainian: Олекса́ндр Сергі́йович Дави́дов) (26 December 1912 – 19 February 1993) was a Soviet and Ukrainian physicist. Davydov graduated from Moscow State University in 1939. In 1963-1990 he was Director of Institute for Theoretical Physics of the Ukrainian Academy of Sciences.

His main contributions were in theory of absorption, scattering and dispersion of the light in molecular crystals. In 1948, he predicted the phenomenon that is known as Davydov splitting or factor-group splitting, "the splitting of bands in the electronic or vibrational spectra of crystals due to the presence of more than one (interacting) equivalent molecular entity in the unit cell." In the period 1958–1960 he developed the theory of collective excited states in spherical and non-spherical nuclei, known as Davydov-Filippov Model and Davydov-Chaban Model.

In 1973, Davydov applied the concept of molecular solitons in order to explain the mechanism of muscle contraction in animals. He studied theoretically the interaction of intramolecular excitations or excess electrons with autolocal breaking of the translational symmetry. These excitations are now known as Davydov solitons. In 1979, Davydov published the first textbook on quantum biology entitled "Biology and Quantum Mechanics" in Russian, which was then translated in English three years later.

== Biography ==
Alexander Davydov was born in Yevpatoria in 1912 in a working class family. After graduating from high school in 1930, he moved to Moscow to work as a grinder at an automobile plant. In 1933, he joined the physics department at the Moscow State University, obtaining his diploma in 1939, five years later. He then joined the graduate school, working with Igor Tamm.

During World War II, he worked at an aircraft facility in Ufa. From 1945 to 1953, he worked at the NASU Institute of Physics.

== Publications ==
- Theory of Absorption of Light by Molecular Crystals, Naukova Dumka, Kiev (1951)
- Theory of Atomic Nuclei, Nauka, Moscow (1958)
- Theory of Molecular Excitons, McGraw-Hill, New York (1962)
- Quantum Mechanics, Translated by Dirk ter Haar (Pergamon Press, 1965) and by Irene Verona Schensted (NEO Press, Ann Arbor, 1966)
- Theory of Molecular Excitons, Plenum Press, New York (1971)
- Theory of Solids, Nauka, Moscow (1980)
- Biology and Quantum Mechanics, Pergamon Press (1982)
- Solitons in Molecular Systems, D. Reidel (1985)
- Solitons in Bioenergetics, Naukova Dumka, Kiev (1986)
- The Theoretical Investigation of High-Temperature Superconductivity, Physics Reports, vol. 190, no. 4–5, pp. 191–306 (1990)
- High-Temperature Superconducitvity, Naukova Dumka, Kiev (1990).

== See also ==
- Metal–semiconductor junction
