= Jubilee Medal "In Commemoration of the 100th Anniversary of the Birth of Vladimir Ilyich Lenin" =

Commemorative medal of the Soviet Union

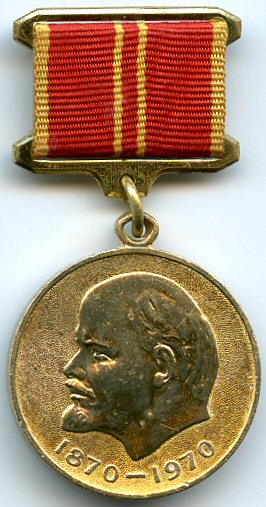
- Jubilee Medal "In Commemoration of the 100th Anniversary of the Birth of Vladimir Ilyich Lenin" (obverse)
- Type: Commemorative medal
- Awarded for: Excellence in civilian or military service to the Socialist State
- Presented by: Soviet Union
- Eligibility: Citizens of the Soviet Union and foreign nationals
- Status: No longer awarded
- Established: November 5, 1969

Highlights
- Total: Civilian – 9,000,000; Military – 2,000,000; Foreign – 5,000
- Ribbon of the Jubilee Medal "In Commemoration of the 100th Anniversary of the Birth of Vladimir Ilyich Lenin"

The Jubilee Medal "In Commemoration of the 100th Anniversary of the Birth of Vladimir Ilyich Lenin" (Russian: Юбилейная медаль В ознаменование 100-летия со дня рождения Владимира Ильича Ленина») was a state commemorative medal of the Soviet Union established by decree of the Presidium of the Supreme Soviet on November 5, 1969 to commemorate the 100th anniversary of the birth of Vladimir Lenin. Its statute was amended on July 18, 1980, by decree of the Presidium of the Supreme Soviet. It was awarded to eminent members of Soviet society, the military leadership and foreign members of the international communist and labour movements.

== Medal Statute ==
The Jubilee Medal "In Commemoration of the 100th Anniversary of the Birth of Vladimir Ilyich Lenin" was established by decree of the Presidium of the Supreme Soviet of the USSR on behalf of the joint resolutions of the republican, territorial and regional Party offices, bodies of government and trade unions, orders of the Minister of Defence, of the Minister of Internal Affairs, of the Chairman of the State Security Committee of the Council of Ministers, of the Commanders of the Armed Forces of the USSR, commanders of military districts, groups of forces, air defence districts and fleets. It was produced and awarded under three official designations, one civilian, one military, the last for award to foreigners. Each is distinguishable from the other by the awards' full names. The civilian award was called The Jubilee Medal "For Valiant Labour – In Commemoration of the 100th Anniversary of the Birth of Vladimir Ilyich Lenin" (Russian: Юбилейная медаль «За доблестный труд – В ознаменование 100-летия со дня рождения Владимира Ильича Ленина»), the military award was called The Jubilee Medal "For Military Valour – In Commemoration of the 100th Anniversary of the Birth of Vladimir Ilyich Lenin" (Russian: Юбилейная медаль «За воинскую доблесть – В ознаменование 100-летия со дня рождения Владимира Ильича Ленина»), the award to foreigners bore the award's basic designation.

=== For Valiant Labour ===
The Jubilee Medal "For Valiant Labour – In Commemoration of the 100th Anniversary of the Birth of Vladimir Ilyich Lenin" was awarded to highly skilled senior workers, farmers, specialists of the national economy, employees of public institutions and public organizations, scientists and cultural figures, who displayed the highest examples of work in preparation for the anniversary of Lenin; to those who took an active part in the struggle for the establishment of Soviet power, or to protect the homeland, or who have made a significant contribution to their work in the building of socialism in the USSR, who helped the party to educate the younger generation by their personal example and social activities.

=== For Military Valour ===
The Jubilee Medal "For Military Valour – In Commemoration of the 100th Anniversary of the Birth of Vladimir Ilyich Lenin" was awarded to soldiers of the Soviet Army, sailors of the Navy, troops of the Ministry of Internal Affairs, troops of the State Security Committee of the Council of Ministers of the USSR, who displayed excellent performance in combat and political training, good results in the management and maintenance of combat readiness in preparation for the anniversary of Lenin.

=== For Foreign Leaders ===
The (basic) Jubilee Medal "In Commemoration of the 100th Anniversary of the Birth of Vladimir Ilyich Lenin" was awarded to foreign leaders of the international communist and labour movement and other progressive activists abroad.

The Jubilee Medal "In Commemoration of the 100th Anniversary of the Birth of Vladimir Ilyich Lenin" is worn on the left breast and when worn with orders and medals of the Soviet Union, placed above them but below the "Gold Star" medal of Hero of the Soviet Union and/or the gold medal "Hammer and Sickle" of Hero of Socialist Labour, in their absence, in their place. When not worn, the ribbon of the medal should be located immediately after the ribbon of the Medal "For Distinguished Labour" in the ribbon bar. If worn in the presence or Orders or medals of the Russian Federation, the latter have precedence.

Each medal came with an attestation of award, this attestation came in the form of a small 8 cm by 11 cm cardboard booklet bearing the award's name, the recipient's particulars and an official stamp and signature on the inside.

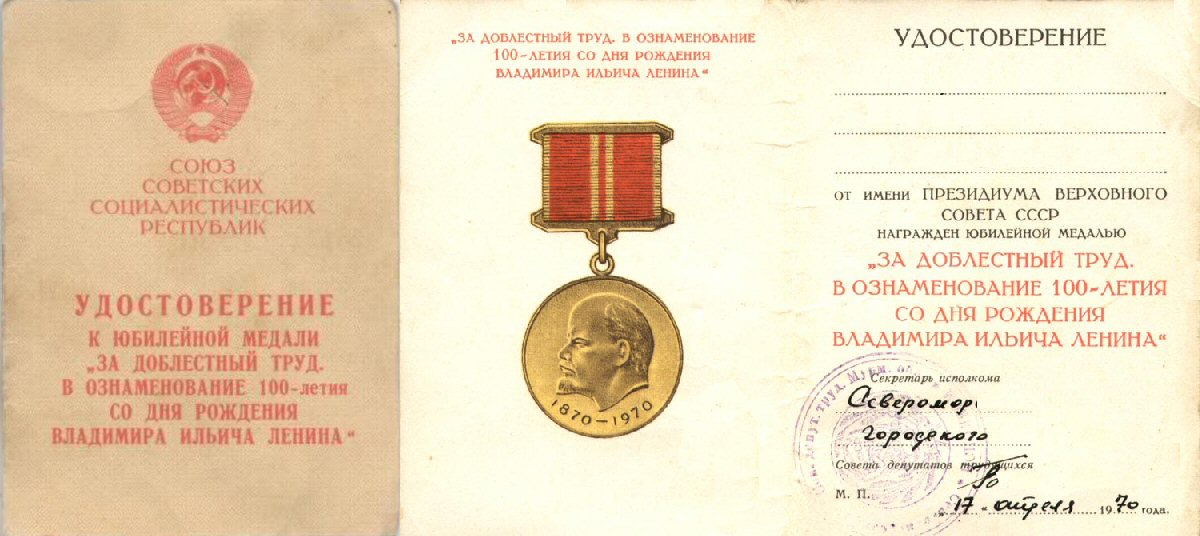
Attestation document for the Jubilee Medal "For Valiant Labour – In Commemoration of the 100th Anniversary of the Birth of Vladimir Ilyich Lenin" (cover and inside pages)

== Medal description ==
The Jubilee Medal "In Commemoration of the 100th Anniversary of the Birth of Vladimir Ilyich Lenin" was a 32mm in diameter circular brass medal. All three variants, civilian, military and for award to foreigners shared the basic design. On a matte finished obverse, the polished left profile of Vladimir Ilyich Lenin over the relief dates "1870 – 1970". The reverse bore at its center the horizontal relief inscription on four lines "TO COMMEMORATE THE 100th ANNIVERSARY OF V.I. LENIN" (Russian: «В ОЗНАМЕНОВАНИЕ 100-ЛЕТИЯ СО ДНЯ РОЖДЕНИЯ В. И. ЛЕНИНА»), above the inscription, the relief image of the hammer and sickle, below the inscription, the relief image of a small five pointed star. The variant to Soviet civilians also bore the relief inscription along the upper medal circumference "FOR VALIANT LABOUR" (Russian: «ЗА ДОБЛЕСТНЫЙ ТРУД»), the military variant bore the relief inscription along the upper medal circumference "FOR MILITARY VALOUR" (Russian: «ЗА ВОИНСКУЮ ДОБЛЕСТЬ»), on the award to foreigners, these inscriptions were omitted.

The Jubilee Medal "In Commemoration of the 100th Anniversary of the Birth of Vladimir Ilyich Lenin" was secured by a ring through the medal suspension loop to a small 29mm wide by 25mm high rectangular mount covered by a 24mm wide red silk moiré ribbon with 2mm yellow edge stripes and two 1mm yellow central stripes separated by 2mm.

Common obverse	Reverse "For Valiant Labour"	Reverse "For Military Valour"	Reverse to foreign leaders

== Recipients ==
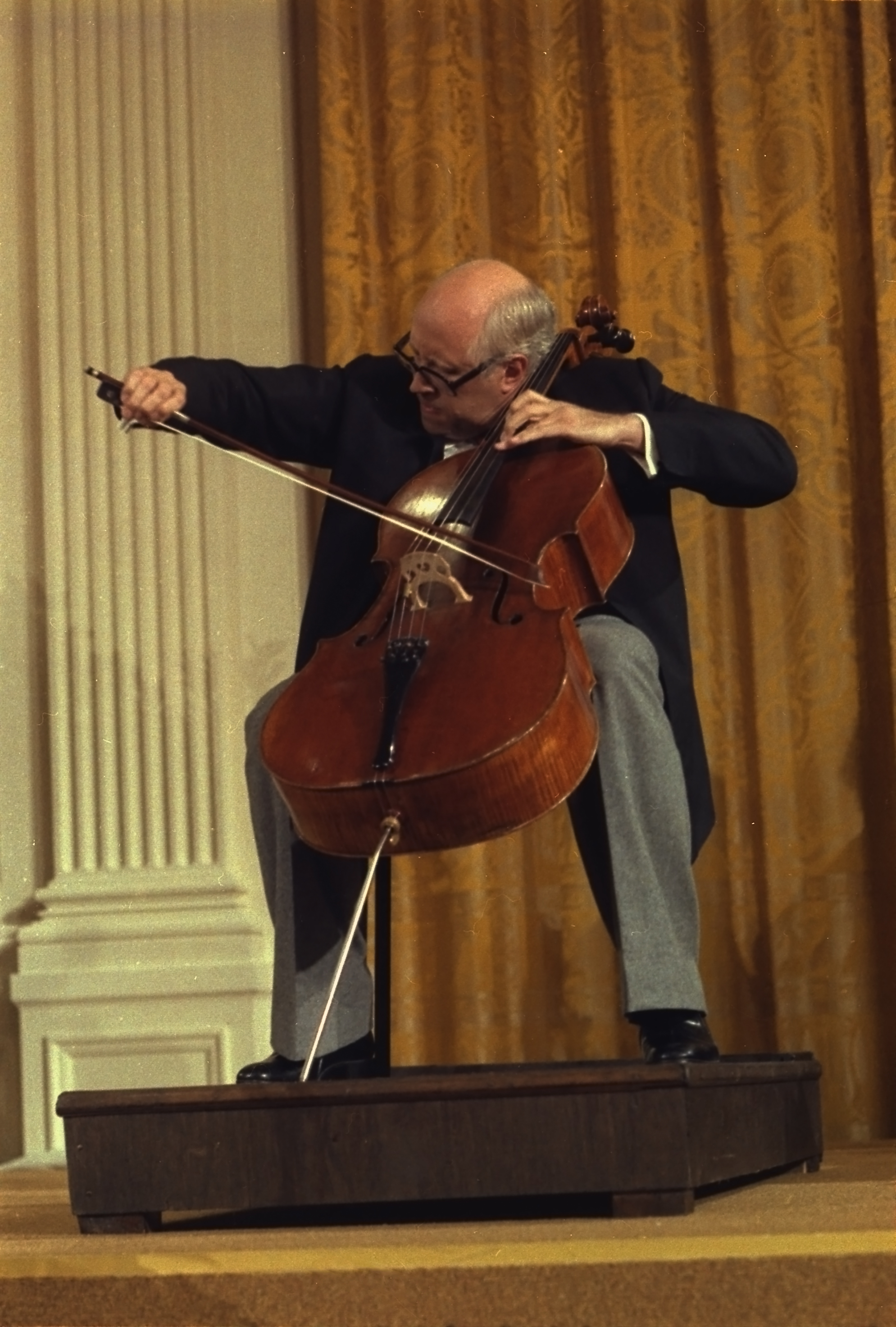
Mstislav Rostropovich, a recipient of the Jubilee Medal "For Valiant Labour in Commemoration of the 100th Anniversary of the Birth of Vladimir Ilyich Lenin"

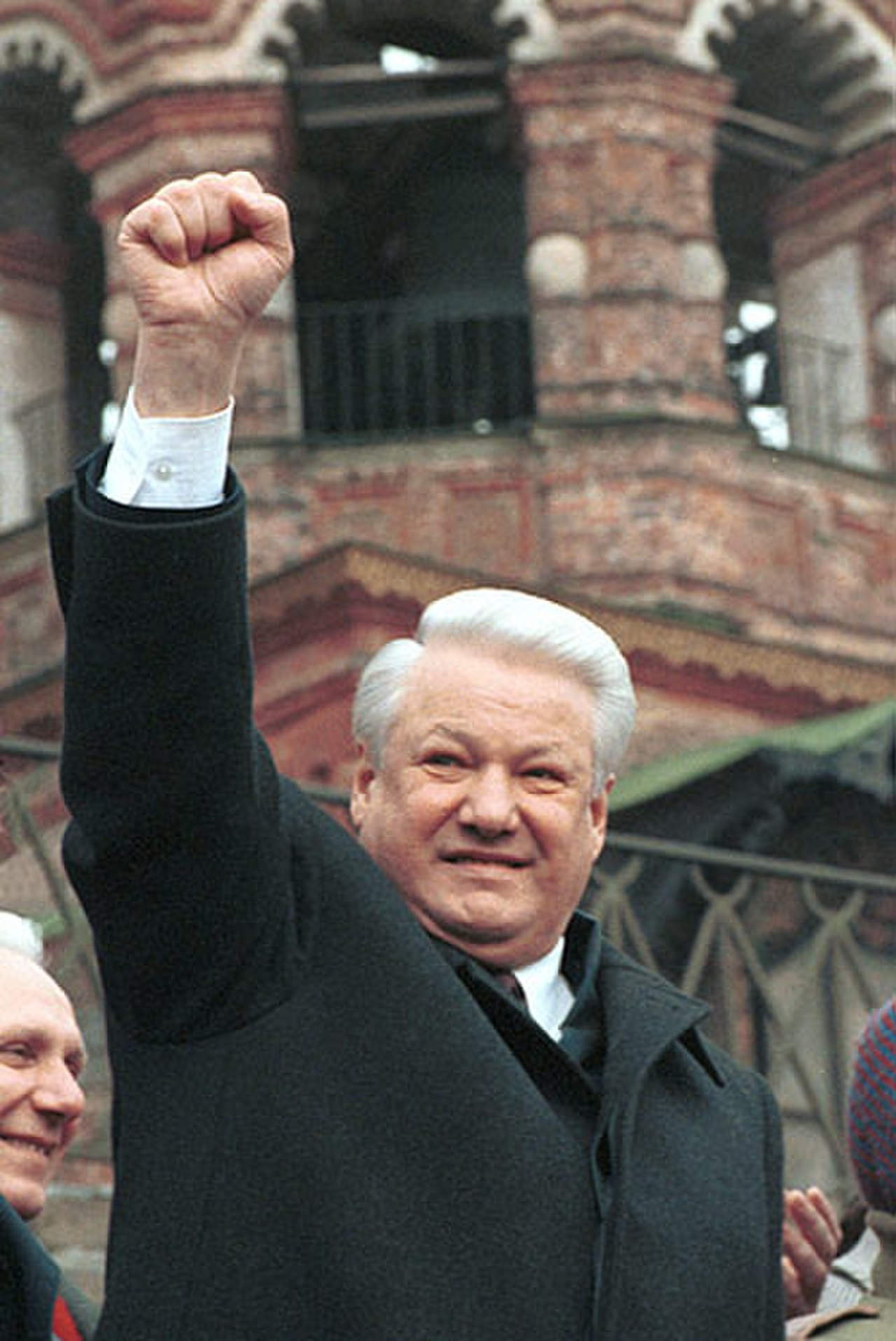
Boris Yeltsin, a recipient of the Jubilee Medal "For Valiant Labour in Commemoration of the 100th Anniversary of the Birth of Vladimir Ilyich Lenin"

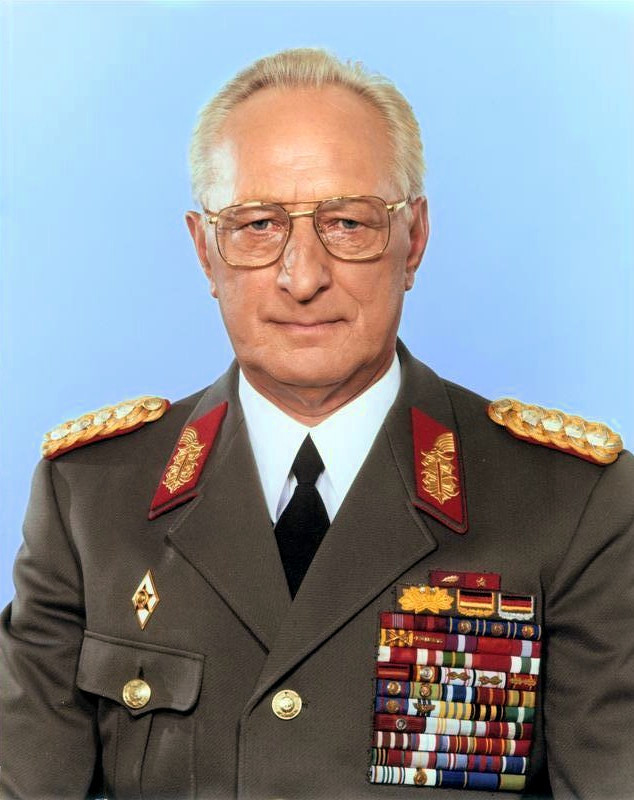
GDR Army General Heinz Kessler, a recipient of the Jubilee Medal "In Commemoration of the 100th Anniversary of the Birth of Vladimir Ilyich Lenin" for foreign nationals

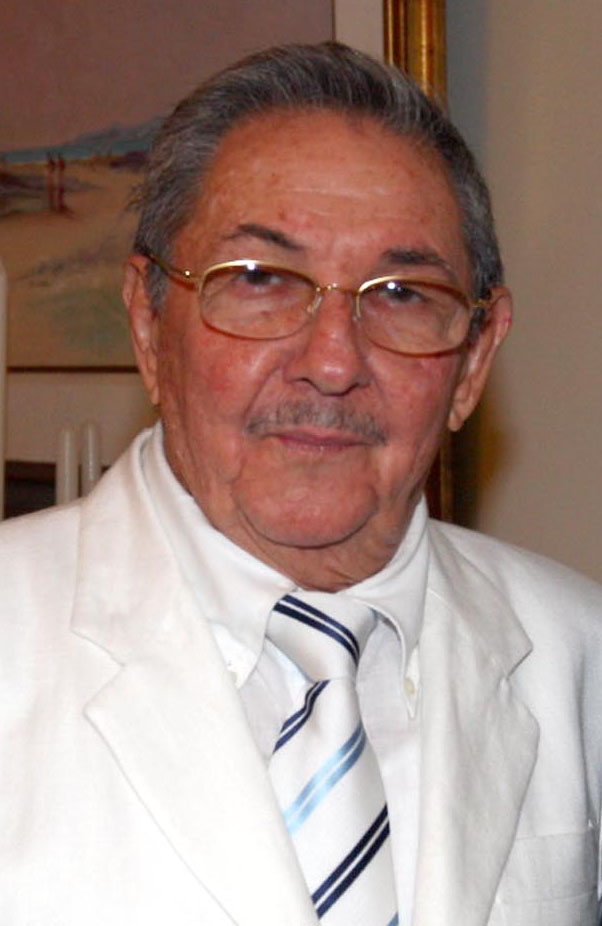
Cuban president Raúl Castro, a recipient of the Jubilee Medal "In Commemoration of the 100th Anniversary of the Birth of Vladimir Ilyich Lenin" for foreign nationals

The individuals below were all recipients of the Jubilee Medal "In Commemoration of the 100th Anniversary of the Birth of Vladimir Ilyich Lenin"

=== Soviet recipients "For Valiant Labour" ===
- Cellist and conductor Mstislav Rostropovich
- Physicist Alexander Prokhorov
- Businessman, politician and statesman Viktor Chernomyrdin
- Politician and statesman Mikhail Fradkov
- Poet Rimma Fyodorovna Kazakova
- Cosmonaut Vitaly Ivanovich Sevastyanov
- Test pilot Vladimir Ilyushin
- Surgeon Grigory Sarkisovich Grigoryants
- Politician Vladimir Dolgikh
- Mezzo-soprano opera singer Zara Aleksandrova Dolukhanova
- Politician and economist Sopubek Begaliev
- Actress Elina Bystritskaya
- Politician Kamil Iskhakov
- Cosmonaut Aleksei Stanislavovich Yeliseyev
- Ballerina Olga Vasiliyevna Lepeshinskaya
- Tatar composer and pianist Röstäm Möxämmätxaci ulı Yaxin
- Georgian linguist and philologist Akaki Gavrilovich Shanidze
- First President of the Russian Federation Boris Nikolayevich Yeltsin
- Rocket scientist Peter Dmitrievich Grushin
- Filmmaker Marlen Martynovich Khutsiev
- Azerbaijani ophthalmologist Sona Akhundova-Bagirbekova
- Ukrainian physicist Halyna Puchkivska
- Seamstress Lyudmila Byakova
- Master builder Zukhra Valeeva
- Metallurgist Alexey Dobryden
- Intercollective farm construction Zakir Qasanov

=== Soviet recipients "For Military Valour" ===
- Marshal of the Soviet Union Georgy Zhukov
- Sniper captain Vasily Zaytsev
- Marshal of the Soviet Union and Defence Minister Dmitriy Feodorovich Ustinov
- Ace fighter pilot and Marshal of Aviation Alexander Pokryshkin
- Marshal of the Soviet Union Vasily Chuikov
- Marshal of the Soviet Union Aleksandr Vasilevsky
- Marshal of the Soviet Union Ivan Yakubovsky
- Marshal of the Soviet Union Ivan Konev
- Marshal of the Soviet Union Pyotr Koshevoy
- Admiral Vladimir Tributs
- Marshal of the Soviet Union Semyon Mikhailovich Budyonny
- Former Russian Interior Minister Viktor Fyodorovich Yerin
- Ballistics specialist Colonel Ivan Fedorovich Ladyga
- Lieutenant Colonel Polina Vladimirovna Gelman
- Admiral of the Fleet of the Soviet Union Alexei Ivanovich Sorokin

=== Foreign recipients ===
- General and later President Wojciech Jaruzelski (Poland)
- General Stanislav Poplavsky (People's Republic of Poland)
- Politician and revolutionary Raúl Castro (Cuba)
- Politician and Minister of State Security Erich Mielke (East Germany)
- Politician and Party First Secretary Walter Ulbricht (East Germany)
- General and Minister of Defence Heinz Kessler (East Germany)
- Political activist, scholar and author Angela Davis (US)

== See also ==
- Awards and decorations of the Soviet Union
