= Aleksandr Leipunskii =

Soviet physicist (1903–1972)

Aleksandr Ilyich Leipunskii (Russian: Алекса́ндр Ильи́ч Лейпу́нский; Ukrainian: Олександр Ілліч Лейпунський; 7 December 1903 – 14 August 1972) was a Soviet physicist.

He was born in the small village of Drahle, Grodno Governorate, Russian Poland. In 1921, he entered the Leningrad Polytechnic Institute, graduating in 1926. He then joined the Leningrad Physico-Technical Institute, where he studied atomic interactions with electrons and molecules.

In 1930, he began research into nuclear physics. He helped organize the Ukrainian Physics and Technology Institute in Kharkiv and became its director. In 1934, he was sent to England for a year as a visiting researcher at the Rutherford Laboratory. In September 1937 Leipunskii was arrested as a German spy in connection with the UPTI Affair, but later released.

After being evacuated to Ufa, in 1941 he also became a head of the Institute of Physics of the Academy of Sciences of the Ukrainian SSR and held that post until 1949.

Following the war, he played a significant role in the development of nuclear power in the Soviet Union. In particular, he pioneered the development of Soviet fast breeder reactor technology. In 1963, he was awarded the Hero of Socialist Labor. The A. I. Leipunsky Institute of Physics and Power Engineering in Obninsk is named after him.
