= Doctor Emeritus =

Doctor Emeritus (Russian:Заслуженный Врач) was the honorary title granted to distinguished physicians by the Presidium of the Supreme Soviet Council of the Union's Republic based on a proposal from the Ministry of Health.
