= Boris Bukreev =

Russian and Soviet mathematician

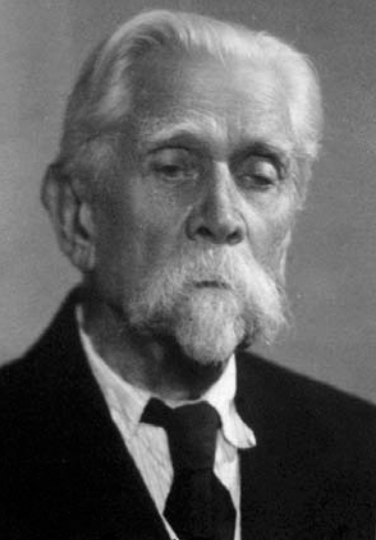
Bukreev in c. 1910

Boris Yakovlevich Bukreev (Russian: Борис Яковлевич Букреев; 6 September 1859 – 2 October 1962) was a Russian and Soviet mathematician who worked in the areas of complex functions and differential equations. He studied Fuchsian functions of rank zero. He was interested in projective and non-Euclidean geometry. He worked on differential invariants and parameters in the theory of surfaces, and also wrote many papers on the history of mathematics.

== Biography ==
Boris Bukreev was born in Lgov, Kursk Governorate, in the Russian Empire, in the family of a schoolteacher. His grandfather was also a school teacher. His early education was at home and later he attended a classical gymnasium at Kursk. In 1878, Bukreev entered the Imperial University of Kyiv. The university was founded in 1834 and had a very strong school of mathematics. In 1880, Bukreev was awarded a gold medal by the Faculty of Physics and Mathematics as the best student. In 1882, he got his first degree and remained at the university to continue his training. At that time he worked on Karl Weierstrass's theory of elliptic functions. This became a topic of his Master's thesis titled "On the expansion of transcendental function in partial fractions". After publishing his thesis. Bukreev went abroad and took lectures of Karl Weierstrass, Lazarus Fuchs, and Leopold Kronecker in Berlin. Bukreev undertook research on Fuchsian functions under Fuchs' guidance, which he completed in 1888 and which became the basis of his doctoral thesis "On the Fuchsian functions of rank zero" defended in 1889.

In 1889, Bukreev became a professor of mathematics at the Imperial University of Kyiv. During the 1890s, Bukreev published a series of papers including: "On the theory of gamma functions," "On some formulas in the theory of elliptic functions of Weierstrass," "On the distribution of the roots of a class of entire transcendental functions," and "Theorems for elliptic functions of Weierstrass". By the end of the 1890s, Bukreev began to undertake research into differential geometry. In 1900, he published "A Course on Applications of Differential and Integral Calculus to Geometry". Although at this time, his main position was in the University of Kyiv, he also taught at the Women's College from 1896 and at the Kyiv Polytechnic Institute of Emperor Alexander II from 1898. He continued to teach at the Polytechnic Institute until 1926. He continued working at the University of Kiev until 1959, and retired at the age of 100. He received a number of scientific and state honors during his life, including the Order of Lenin and the Order of the Red Banner of Labour.

Bukreev published a number of books which proved influential. For example, "Introduction to the theory of series," "Elements of the theory of determinants," "Course on definite integrals" (1903), and "Elements of algebraic analysis" (1912). In 1934, he published "An Introduction to the Calculus of Variations." His most important book on non-Euclidean geometry was "Non-Euclidean Planimetry in Analytic Terms", which he published in 1951. Bukreev continued actively working in mathematics up to the very end of his life; his last paper was published when he was 98.

== Family life ==
Bukreev married a daughter of Aleksei Aleksandrovich Kozlov (Russian philosopher, a notable representative of Russian school of panpsychism, and professor of philosophy at Kyiv University from 1884). They had three children, Tatiana, Nikolai and Yevgeny. His grandson, Kirill Tolpygo (son of Tatiana and Boris Nikolaevich Tolpygo), became a prominent Ukrainian physicist, corresponding member of the National Academy of Sciences of Ukraine.

== Books ==
- A Course on Applications of Differential and Integral Calculus to Geometry
- An Introduction to the Calculus of Variations
- Non-Euclidean Planimetry in Analytic Terms

== Sources ==
- O'Connor, John J.; Robertson, Edmund F., "Boris Yakovlevic Bukreev", MacTutor History of Mathematics Archive, University of St Andrews
