= Kulykivka settlement hromada =

Kulykivka settlement hromada Куликівська селищна громада
- Hromada
- Interactive map of Kulykivka settlement hromada
- Country: Ukraine
- Oblast: Chernihiv
- Raion: Chernihiv

Area
  - Total: 861.8 km^{2} (332.7 sq mi)

Population (2020)
  - Total: 14,539
  - Density: 16.87/km^{2} (43.69/sq mi)
- CATOTTG code: UA74100210000053397
- Settlements: 23
- Villages: 22
- Towns: 1
- Website: kulykivska-gromada.gov.ua

Kulykivka settlement hromada (Ukrainian: Куликівська селищна громада) is a hromada of Ukraine, located in Chernihiv Raion, Chernihiv Oblast. Its administrative center is the town of Kulykivka. The Kulykivka settlement hromada is located in the central part of Chernihiv Oblast, on the Dnieper lowland, in a zone of mixed forests. It has an area of 861.8 square kilometres (332.7 mi^{2}) and a population of 14,539, as of 2020.

== Composition ==
The hromada includes 23 settlements: 1 town (Kulykivka) and 22 villages:

- Avdiivka
- Baklanova Muraviyka
- Budyshche
- Veresoch
- Vershynova Muraviyka
- Vesele
- Vybli
- Hluzdy
- Horbove
- Hrabivka
- Drimaylivka
- Drozdivka
- Zhukivka
- Kladkivka
- Kovchyn
- Kosharishche
- Orlivka
- Penyazunka
- Saltykova Divitsia
- Uborki
- Ukrainka
- Khybalivka

== Geography ==
The Kulykivka settlement hromada is located in the central part of Chernihiv Oblast, on the Dnieper lowland, in a zone of mixed forests.

The relief is flat, there are swamps. The Desna River flows through the territory of the community. There are also lakes, ponds and an artificial reservoir on the territory of the hromada. The soils are sod-podzolic, there is chernozem. Minerals are peat, sand, clay.

The climate of Kulykivka settlement hromada is moderately continental, with warm summers and relatively mild winters. The average temperature in January is about -7°C, and in July - +19°C. The average annual precipitation ranges from 550 to 660 mm, with the highest precipitation in the summer period.

The railway line of the South-Western Railway and the Chernihiv-Pyryatyn highway pass through its territory.

== Symbolism ==
The Kulikivska settlement territorial community has its own symbols - a coat of arms and a flag, which reflect its historical, cultural, and spiritual traditions. The coat of arms of the community is a green heraldic shield, on which a golden sandpiper is depicted, above it on the left - a golden crescent, on the right - a golden eight-pointed star, below - crossed golden arrows and sabers with their points pointing down. The green color of the shield symbolizes hope, prosperity, and natural wealth. The sandpiper is a symbol of the territory, which in ancient times was mostly swampy and rich in this bird. The crescent symbolizes the endowment of talents. The star means happiness and goodness and is a symbol of Christianity. The arrow and saber are ancient Cossack weapons, symbolizing the struggle for the freedom of their native land from the oppressors. The community flag is a rectangular green cloth with a horizontal silver stripe 1/5 of the width of the flag running through the middle. In the upper corner from the flagpole, on a green background, a yellow sandpiper is depicted, facing the flagpole.

== See also ==
- List of hromadas of Ukraine
