= Lyudmila Byakova =

Russian seamstress and politician

- Людмилa Бякова
- Born: Lyudmila Stepanovna Byakova; 23 March 1946 (age 79); Ryakhi, Kirov Oblast, Zuyevsky District, Russian RSFSR, Soviet Union
- Occupation: Seamstress-minder
- Years active: 1962–present
- Spouse: Anatoly Alekseevich Byakov
- Children: 1
- Awards: Jubilee Medal "In Commemoration of the 100th Anniversary of the Birth of Vladimir Ilyich Lenin"; Order of the Red Banner of Labour; USSR State Prize; Order of the October Revolution; Hero of Socialist Labor; Order of Lenin

Lyudmila Stepanovna Byakova (Russian: Людмила Степановна Бякова; born 23 March 1946) is a Soviet and Russian seamstress-minder who worked at the Kirovo-Chepetsk garment factory and at the Kurgan Industrial Sewing Association. She supported an initiative by the Leningrad seamstress Chistyakova's "Five-year plan – two personal five-year plans.", finishing 21 annual assignments and training 41 young drivers over the course of a decade. Byakova led the All-Russian School of Professional Excellence and gave her experience of advanced methods of work to 24 seamstresses from various garment factories in the Soviet Union. She was an elected deputy of the Congress of People's Deputies of the Soviet Union from women's groups from 1989 to 1991 and was on the Committee for Women, Family Protection, Motherhood and Childhood. Byakova was a delegate at the 27th Congress of the Communist Party of the Soviet Union in 1986 and at the 16th Congress of the All-Union Central Council of Trade Unions. She has been awarded the Jubilee Medal "In Commemoration of the 100th Anniversary of the Birth of Vladimir Ilyich Lenin"; the Order of the Red Banner of Labour; the USSR State Prize; the Order of the October Revolution and the title of Hero of Socialist Labor with the Order of Lenin.

== Biography ==
On 23 March 1946, Byakova was born into a family of collective farmers in the village of Ryakhi, Kirov Oblast, Zuyevsky District, Russian RSFSR. Following her graduation from the eighth grade at her school in 1962, she became a seamstress apprentice at the Kirovo-Chepetsk garment factory in the Kirov Oblast, and three months later, she combined her secondary education that she did at night with work on the assembly line.

Byakova was appointed foreperson in 1965 after completing her secondary education and worked in that position from 1967. She studied with a group of sewing masters at the Minsk branch of the Moscow Institute for Advanced Training of Light Industry Workers in 1971 and attended the Kirov Mechanics and Technology College between 1971 and 1972. Byakova relocated to the city of Kurgan, Kurgan Oblast five years later, and was transferred to working as a seamstress-minder at the Kurgan Industrial Sewing Association of the Ministry of Light Industry of the RSFSR. She was one of the first workers at the factory to support the initiative by the Leningrad seamstress Chistyakova's "Five-year plan – two personal five-year plans.". Byakova's first two five-year plans were completed in four years and two months on 7 March 1980. When doing her eleventh from 1981 to 1985 and twelfth between 1986 and 1990 five-year plans, she finished 21 annual assignments and trained 41 young workers during 10 years of her profession. Byakova was the leader of the All-Russian School of Professional Excellence and provided her experience of advanced methods of work to 24 seamstresses from various garment factories in the Soviet Union.

She also combined her seamstress work with being active in social activities. Byakova became a member of the Communist Party of the Soviet Union in 1978. She was a delegate at the 27th Congress of the Communist Party of the Soviet Union in 1986. From 1989 to 1991, Byakova served as an elected deputy of the Congress of People's Deputies of the Soviet Union from women's councils, focusing on issues relating to childhood and motherhood by being on the Committee for Women, Family Protection, Motherhood and Childhood. She was also a delegate to the 16th Congress of the All-Union Central Council of Trade Unions. Byakova was elected to the Kurgan Regional Committee of the Communist Party of the Soviet Union for the period between 1979 and 1985 and was chair of the women's council of the Oktyabrsky district of Kurgan from 1988 to 1990. She was the guest of honour at the meeting of drummers in Bulgaria that was dedicated to the 40th anniversary of the Stakhanov movement in Russia. In 1999, Byakova was a launcher at the Lodiya Sewing Firia OJSC, which was the former Kurgan Garment Factory.

She retired in 2001. Byakova was the secretary of the Association of Heroes of Socialist Labor and full cavaliers of the Order of Labor Glory of the Kurgan region between 2002 and 2006. She is a member of the Presidium of the Regional Council of Veterans.

== Personal life ==
Byakova is married to Anatoly Alekseevich Byakov. They have a son who is a designer.

== Awards ==
In 1970, she was awarded the Jubilee Medal "In Commemoration of the 100th Anniversary of the Birth of Vladimir Ilyich Lenin". Byakova was named a recipient of the Order of the Red Banner of Labour on 12 May 1977. She was named a laureate of the USSR State Prize in 1982 "for his great personal contribution to increasing the output and improving the quality of consumer goods", the proceeds of which she handed to the Kurgan Orphanage. Byakova was given the Order of the October Revolution on 2 July 1984. She was conferred the title of Honorary Citizen of the City of Kurgan in 1984. The Presidium of the Supreme Soviet decorated Byakova the title of Hero of Socialist Labor with the Order of Lenin and the "Hammer and Sickle" gold medal on 19 July 1988. She is one of six residents of Kurgan to receive the Hero of Socialist Labor. She was named an Honored Worker of the Textile and Light Industry of the RSFSR and The Best Seamstress-Minder of the Ministry of Light Industry of the RSFSR.
