= Kulykivka =

Rural locality in Chernihiv Oblast, Ukraine

Kulykivka Куликівка
- Rural settlement
- Location of Kulykivka Kulykivka (Ukraine)
- Coordinates: 51°22′29″N 31°38′37″E
- Country: Ukraine
- Oblast: Chernihiv Oblast
- Raion: Chernihiv Raion
- Founded: 1650

Area
  - Total: 65.33 km^{2} (25.22 sq mi)

Population (2022)
  - Total: 4,928
- Postcode: 16300
- Area code: +380 4643

Kulykivka (Ukrainian: Куликівка; Russian: Куликовка, romanized: Kulikovka) is a rural settlement in Chernihiv Raion, Chernihiv Oblast, northern Ukraine. It hosts the administration of Kulykivka settlement hromada, one of the hromadas of Ukraine. The Kulykivka is located on the Dnieper lowland, in a zone of mixed forests, in Chernihiv Polissya. Kulykivka was founded in 1650. Population: 4,928 (2022 estimate).

== History ==
Until 18 July 2020, Kulykivka was the administrative center of Kulykivka Raion. The raion was abolished in July 2020 as part of the administrative reform of Ukraine, which reduced the number of raions of Chernihiv Oblast to five. The area of Kulykivka Raion was merged into Chernihiv Raion.

Until 26 January 2024, Kulykivka was designated urban-type settlement. On this day, a new law entered into force which abolished this status, and Kulykivka became a rural settlement.

== Geography ==
The Kulykivka is located in the central part of Chernihiv Oblast, on the Dnieper lowland, in a zone of mixed forests, in Chernihiv Polissya.

The terrain is flat, there are swamps. Kulykivka is located in the Desna River valley. There are also lakes and ponds on the territory of the urban-type settlement. The soils are sod-podzolic.

The climate of Kulykivka is moderately continental, with warm summers and relatively mild winters. The average temperature in January is about -7 °C, and in July - +19 °C. The average annual precipitation ranges from 550 to 660 mm, with the highest precipitation in the summer period.

The railway line of the South-Western Railway and the Chernihiv-Pyryatyn highway pass through the village.
