= Kirill Tolpygo =

Kirill Borisovich Tolpygo (Ukrainian: Кирилo Борисович Толпиго; Russian: Кирилл Борисович Толпыго; 3 May 1916 – 13 May 1994) was a Soviet physicist and a corresponding member of the National Academy of Sciences of Ukraine. He was recognized for his works on condensed matter theory; the theory of phonon spectra in crystals; electronic structure and defects in insulators and semiconductors; and biophysics. He created the Department of Theoretical Physics and the Department of Biophysics at Donetsk National University. Tolpygo was a teacher, mentor and scientific adviser to graduate students. Tolpygo was awarded the Order of the Great Patriotic War (2nd Degree).

== Early life ==
Tolpygo was born during WWI in Kyiv, Ukraine, then part of the Russian Empire. His father, Boris Nikolaevich Tolpygo (1889 – 1958) was a jurist who received the Order of St. Stanislaus for his services to the Russian army during World War I. Tolpygo's mother, Tatiana B. Bukreeva (1889 – 1992), was the daughter of Boris Yakovlevich Bukreev, a mathematician and geometer at Kyiv University (University of St. Volodymyr, Kyiv). In 1923, Tolpygo's father was arrested by the Cheka, for alleged "counter-revolutionary" activities. Through the intervention of individuals such as Raymond Poincaré, President of France, he avoided execution and was sentenced to 10 years hard labor. In 1947, Tolpygo's father was again imprisoned. It was 1957 before he would return to Kyiv, shortly before his death. Hence, Tolpygo grew up in the family of his grandfather, Boris Y. Bukreev.

== Education ==
Tolpygo's life was complicated by being the son of a political prisoner. Nevertheless, he was allowed to enter Kyiv University. After graduating from the Physics and Mathematics Faculty in 1939, he went on to post graduate study at the Institute of Physics of the Ukrainian SSR Academy of Sciences and started his research work in theoretical physics. His scientific adviser was Solomon Isaakovich Pekar, creator of the theory of polarons.

== Military service ==
In November 1939, Tolpygo was drafted into the Red Army and served in the artillery section during World War II from 1941 to 1945. He was wounded during the Yelnya Offensive in 1941. He returned to Kyiv in 1945 when all physicists were recalled from active duty to work on the atomic bomb and other projects, and to restore universities and research institutions destroyed during the War.

== Scientific career ==
On returning to Kyiv, Tolpygo restarted work on his PhD thesis and helped in restoring the university. From 1945 to 1966 Tolpygo was teaching theoretical physics at Kiev State University. One of his students was Emmanuel Rashba, who became a prominent theoretical physicist and credited his success in significant part to Tolpygo's guidance and support. From 1963, Tolpygo was professor of physics, and from 1960 to 1966 he was chair of the Department of Theoretical Physics. Concurrently, from 1948 to 1960, he worked as a senior scientist at the Institute of Physics of the Academy of Sciences of UkrSSR, Kiev. He received his Candidate of Sciences (PhD) degree in 1949 and his Doctor of Sciences in 1962. In 1965 he was elected a Corresponding Member of the Academy of Sciences of UkrSSR.

In 1966, Tolpygo moved with his family from Kiev to Donetsk, Ukraine. From 1966 to 1988 he worked as head of the Department of Theoretical Physics at Donetsk Physical-Technical Institute (DonPTI) of the Ukrainian Academy of Sciences and at the same time was professor and chair of the Department of Theoretical Physics at Donetsk State University.

== Support of dissidents ==
Tolpygo joined the movement of the "Sixtiers" (shestidesiatniki) and signed a letter to the Soviet authorities in support of dissidents Alexander Ginzburg and Yuri Galanskov. As a result, his position at Kyiv University was jeopardized. At the time, academician Alexander A. Galkin was organizing a new scientific center in Donetsk, Ukraine. His aim was to decentralize scientific research and promote science and technology in regional Ukraine. Galkin convinced Tolpygo to join him in Donetsk and create there a new school of theoretical physics, far from political scrutiny.

== Later life ==
From 1988 to his death in 1994 Tolpygo worked as principal scientist at the DonPTI and continued to teach physics at the university. Tolpygo also enjoyed music. He practiced the piano regularly. The Beethoven piano sonatas were among his favorites. In his later years, Tolpygo developed an interest in ecology and environmentalism.

== Family life ==
Tolpygo had four children: Alexey (a mathematician, chess player, and political writer) and Natalia (musician and piano teacher) from his first marriage in 1946 to Oksana Fedorivna Tomasevych, a theoretical physicist, and Sergey (a condensed matter physicist) and Vladimir (a materials scientist), from a second marriage in 1959 to Yelena Isaakovna Kaplunova Tolpygo, also a physicist.

== Scientific work ==
=== Crystal lattice dynamics and polaritons ===
Between 1949 and 1956, Tolpygo built a quantum-mechanical theory of crystal lattice dynamics. It included deformation of electronic shells of ions and effects of retardation. In the theory of crystal lattice dynamics this model is now known as Tolpygo model, a model of deformable ions, or a "shell model". In 1950, he predicted bound states of photons and optical phonons in ionic crystals, now known as lattice polaritons. A year later the same result was independently obtained by Kun Huang using a different method. These mixed states were subsequently investigated experimentally. S.I. Pekar proposed to name these states 'light excitons.' However, this name did not stick and term polaritons proposed by Hopfield is used.

Later, Tolpygo generalized his theory to describe homopolar crystals (Si, Ge, diamond, etc.), cryocrystals of noble gases, and molecular crystals by introducing long-range Coulomb interactions in their lattice dynamics. On this basis, he developed a microscopic theory of optical and elastic properties of crystals. A number of new effects were predicted, e.g., generation of an electric field (electromagnetic wave) in a crystal by a nonuniform deformation (wave). This effect is now known as flexoelectric effect. In 1961, Tolpygo predicted generation of sound by moving current carriers, now a well known effect in acousto-electronics. Tolpygo applied his theory of deformable ions to study the small-radius localized states of electrons in solids. This theory accounted for the interaction of electrons with phonons of all branches and wavelengths, and was applied to the theory of polaritons, F-centers, and excitons in alkali halide crystals.

=== Kinetic phenomena in semiconductors ===
Tolpygo also worked on kinetic phenomena in semiconductors and their phenomenological theory: theory of bipolar carrier diffusion, theory of thermal emission, photovoltaic effect, p-n junctions, theory of thermal rectification, surface phenomena, etc.

=== Many-electron theory ===
Tolpygo also worked on the "many-electron" theory of crystals: development of an efficient method for accounting electron correlations in the band theory; justification of the quasi-molecular model of valence crystals; and the theory of their optical absorption based on a model of metastable Frenkel excitons. He developed a theory of defect formation at intrinsic optical absorption; a microscopic theory of optical absorption by crystals; and a microscopic theory of Cherenkov radiation as it results from generation of light-excitons (polaritons) by the field of a moving relativistic electron.

=== Biophysics ===
In addition to condensed matter physics, Tolpygo was also interested in biophysics. He proposed an original microscopic theory of muscle contraction based on the idea that the energy of decomposition of adenosine triphosphate (ATP) molecule is transferred along the chains of hydrogen bonds between actin and myosin polymers causing their mutual motion. This theory allowed him to explain experimental features of muscle contraction, such as the relation of tension to velocity as described by Hill's muscle model. He also studied mechanisms of mutations and investigated nonradiative excitations of protons in hydrogen bonds in DNA. He predicted a new quasiparticle – protonic exciton – and investigated its properties.
