= Takhta =

Takhta (Persian: تخت), a variation of ottoman (furniture), is a carpet-or-material-covered backless divan (furniture), or sofa. This piece of furniture is very popular in the Central Asian cultures where takhta, often located in the backyards, serves as a place where people sit around to talk, eat and have a piyāla of green tea. In the summer times, takhta also serves as a perfect bed substitute.
