= Valentyn Bugrym =

Ukrainian journalist and academic

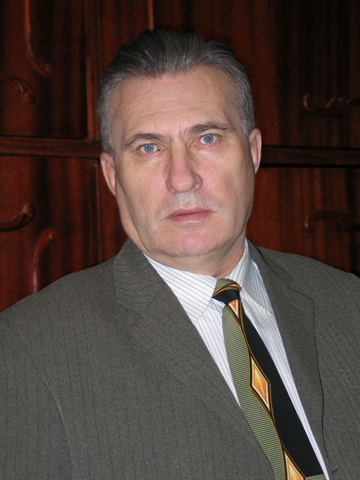
- Born: 14 November 1952 (age 73); Khmeliv, Sumy Oblast, Ukrainian SSR
- Occupation: journalist

Valentyn Volodymyrovych Bugrym (Ukrainian: Валентин Володимирович Бугрим; born 14 November 1952) is a Ukrainian journalist and academic who is active in both print and broadcast media.

== Family and early life ==
Valentyn was born in the village of Khmeliv in the Sumy Oblast. His mother, Antonina Ivanivna Bugrym, was a dentist and a descendant of Ukrainian writer Mikhail Staitskiy. His father, Volodymyr Petrovych Bugrym came from a Cossack family and took part in the Great Patriotic War and was highly decorated.

== Career ==
He has been a member and deputy chief editor of the Main Editorial Board of Information of Ukrainian television of Derzteleradio Ukraine. He has also been an anchorman and commentator of informational TV programs.

Valentyn Bugrym has held various positions with the faculty of the Institute of Journalism of the National Taras Shevchenko University of Kyiv since 1977, including lecturer, associate professor, and mass information activity organization chair. He is also affiliated with other educational institutions in Kyiv, such as the Institute of International Relations, the Institute of Cinema and Television and the Institute of Culture of the National University of Culture and Arts, and the National Economic University of Kyiv.

He is politically active, and is connected with the Cossacks. He has been involved with the areas of journalism and advertising at the national professional level. He is a member of the Management Board of the Union of Advertisers of Ukraine and helped write laws governing these fields in Ukraine.

=== Specialties ===
Bugrym works primarily in studying theoretical and applied problems in advertising and journalism (broadcast and print), specializing in Ukrainian politics and history as the fields are connected to their European counterparts. The practical application of his results are used in advertising and PR curricula.

He also works closely with students and has been involved with courses in the fields of journalism and advertising. Additionally, he has written a number of books, manuals, and monographs in print and online, which are used in local curricula. He is a strong advocate of international co-operation, working in conjunction with universities, professional associations and conferences in Bratislava, Moscow, Italy and France.
