= Vadim Lashkaryov =

Vadim Evgenievich Lashkaryov (October 7, 1903 – December 1, 1974) was a Soviet experimental physicist. He was an academician of the National Academy of Sciences of Ukraine and is known for his fundamental contributions to physics of semiconductors.

== Life ==
He was born in Kyiv, to a family of a lawyer.

== Career ==
Lashkaryov graduated from the Kyiv Institute for People Education (as the Kyiv University was termed at that time) in 1924. He started his research work on the diffraction of X-rays in the Kyiv Polytechnic Institute and continued it in the newly established Institute of Physics of the Ukrainian Academy of Sciences. In 1928 he moved to Physical-Technical Institute in Leningrad (currently Ioffe Institute in Saint Petersburg), where he performed first in the Soviet Union experiments on electron diffraction. After a forced stay in Arkhangelsk, where he taught physics in the local Medical Institute, Lashkaryov returned to Kyiv in 1939, where he switched to physics of semiconductors.

In 1941 Lashkaryouv published his fundamental discovery, the presence of a semiconductor layer between the barrier layer and the adjacent electrode, and the opposite sign of charge carriers (electrons and holes) on both sides of a barrier layer in solar cells of Cu_{2}O and silver sulphide photocells and selenium rectifiers. In current terms, this was a discovery of p–n junctions around the rectifying layers in these systems. This discovery was made by measuring the sign change of thermo-e.m.f. on both sides of the rectifying layer by using miniature thermoprobes. During World War II, Lashkaryov worked in the city of Ufa on cuprous-oxide devices for defense needs. After World War II, back in Kyiv, Lashkaryov investigated bipolar diffusion of photo-carriers in cuprous oxide, photoconductivity of CdS and CdSe, and also on Ge diodes and transistors.

In 1960, Lashkaryov founded in Kyiv the Institute of Semiconductors of the Ukrainian Academy of Sciences that currently carries his name. He also established a Chair in semiconductor physics in the Taras Shevchenko National University of Kyiv.

== See also ==
- Photodiode
