= Bardeen–Pines interaction =

Microscopic interaction in metals

In condensed matter physics, Bardeen–Pines interaction describes an effective interaction between two electrons in a metal. It combines the long-range repulsive Coulomb interaction with an attractive force mediated by lattice vibrations (phonons). The total interaction is modified by screening from the surrounding electron gas. Under certain conditions, this screening leads to overscreening, where the attractive phonon-mediated part of the interaction can temporarily dominate over the repulsive Coulomb force. This attractive component plays a crucial role in the formation of Cooper pairs in conventional superconductors and is a key ingredient in the BCS theory of superconductivity.

The interaction potential can be derived using quantum field theory under the random phase approximation (RPA), which captures the screening effects quantitatively.

It is named after John Bardeen and David Pines who postulated its existence in 1955.

== Description ==
The Bardeen–Pines interaction consist of the dynamic interaction between an electron and a phonon. In Fourier space, it is described by the potential

$$V(\mathbf q,\omega)=\frac{e^2}{\epsilon_0}\frac{1}{|\mathbf \mathbf q|^2+k_{\mathrm{TF}}^2}\left(1+\frac{\omega_{\mathrm{ph}}^2}{\omega^2-\omega^2_{\mathrm{ph}}}\right)$$,

where $\mathbf \mathbf q=\mathbf k'-\mathbf k$ is the difference in electron wave vector between two electrons, $\omega$ is the difference in frequency, e is the elementary charge, $\epsilon_0$ the vacuum permittivity, $k_{\mathrm{TF}}=\sqrt{3e^2n_{\mathrm e}/2\epsilon_0 E_{\mathrm F}}$ is the Thomas–Fermi wave vector, $n_{\mathrm e}$ is the electron density, $E_{\mathrm F}$ is the Fermi energy, and $\omega_{\mathrm{ph}}$ is the phonon frequency.

The potential consist of the sum of two terms, of a frequency-independent term proportional to $(|\mathbf q|^2+k_{\mathrm{TF}}^2)^{-1}$ which reproduces Thomas–Fermi screening. For frequencies smaller than the phonon frequency, the frequency-dependent term proportional to $\omega_{\mathrm{ph}}^2/(\omega^2-\omega^2_{\mathrm{ph}} )$ represent a retarded attractive interaction between electrons due to phonon exchange. In superconducting metals, this assumption is valid for electrons with energies close to the Fermi energy. This term is responsible for the creation of Cooper pairs.

== Bardeen–Pines Hamiltonian ==
Using second quantization, Bardeen–Pines interaction leads the Hamiltonian

$$\hat{H}=\sum_{\mathbf k \sigma }\varepsilon_{\mathbf k} \hat{c}^\dagger_{\mathbf k \sigma }\hat{c}_{\mathbf k \sigma }+\frac12 \sum_{\mathbf k \mathbf k'}V(\mathbf q,(\epsilon_{\mathbf k}-\epsilon_{\mathbf k'})/\hbar)\hat{c}^\dagger_{\mathbf k-\mathbf q, \sigma}\hat{c}^\dagger_{\mathbf k'+\mathbf q, \sigma '}\hat{c}_{\mathbf k' \sigma' }\hat{c}_{\mathbf k \sigma },$$

where $\hat{c}^\dagger_{\mathbf k\sigma}$ and $\hat{c}_{\mathbf k\sigma}$ are fermionic creation and annihilation operators, $\sigma$ indicates the spin and $\varepsilon_{\mathbf k}$ is the kinetic energy. From this Hamiltonian, the BCS Hamiltonian was derived.

== History ==
A phonon mediated interaction to explain superconductivity was first proposed by Herbert Fröhlich in 1952. About the same year, David Bohm and David Pines developed the random phase approximation (RPA). John Bardeen and Frederick Seitz who learned about Bohm–Pines theory, invited Pines to University of Illinois Urbana-Champaign in July 1952 to study Frölich's polaron theory. Tsung-Dao Lee, Francis E. Low and Pines worked on the details from a quantum field theory perspective.

Afterwards, Bardeen and Pines used the RPA to derive the electron-phonon interaction by adding screening effects in 1955. In 1956, Leon Cooper showed that an attractive electron-electron interaction, no matter how small, could suffice to understand superconductivity. Bardeen, John Robert Schrieffer and Cooper used this interaction to develop BCS theory which explained conventional superconductivity in 1957, for which the three physicists were awarded the Nobel Prize in Physics in 1972.

Gerasim M. Eliashberg added the retardation effects to Bardeen–Pines interaction in 1960.

In 1965, Walter Kohn and Joaquin Mazdak Luttinger proposed an alternative pairing mechanism based on Friedel oscillations. In contrast with Bardeen–Pines interaction, Kohn–Luttinger superconductivity does not require lattice interactions.
