= William A. Little (physicist) =

American physicist

- Born: November 17, 1930 (age 95); Adelaide, South Africa
- Education: University of South Africa (BSc); Rhodes University (PhD); University of Glasgow (PhD)
- Known for: Little–Parks effect
- Awards: APS Fellow (1961)
- Scientific career
- Fields: Condensed matter physics
- Workplaces: Stanford University
- Doctoral students: Robert Hallock

William Arthur Little (born 17 November 1930) is a South African-born American physicist and Professor Emeritus at Stanford University, specializing in condensed matter physics. He is also the chairman of two manufacturing companies that he co-founded.

== Early life and academic career ==
Little was born in Adelaide, South Africa on 17 November 1930. He graduated from the University of South Africa in 1950 and then received two PhD degrees, one from Rhodes University in 1955 and the other from the University of Glasgow in 1957.

He worked for the National Research Council Canada as a postdoctoral fellow from 1956 to 1958. He then served as an assistant and associate professor at Stanford University from 1958 to 1965 and as a professor from 1965 until his retirement in 1994, after which he became an emeritus professor at the university.

During his academic career, he held the fellowships from the Alfred P. Sloan Foundation from 1959 to 1962, and from the John Simon Guggenheim Memorial Foundation from 1964 to 1965. He also served as a visiting professor at the University of Geneva from 1964 to 1965, and as a senior fellow at the National Science Foundation from 1971 to 1972.

== Business career ==
Since retiring, Little has shifted his focus towards managing MMR Technologies Inc., which he co-founded in 1980. The company produces cryogenic equipment and instruments for materials science, including micro-miniature refrigerators, office liquid nitrogen generators, and cryocoolers used with X-ray and gamma-ray detectors. In 1999, he also co-founded 3L&T, Inc., which specializes in the development of polymer material technologies and provides corrosion protection coatings and linings for industrial plants.

== Research ==
His research has focused on low-temperature physics, superconductivity, and neural network theory.

In 1962, Little and Ronald D. Parks conducted experiments involving empty and thin-walled superconducting cylinders that were subjected to a parallel magnetic field. They observed periodic oscillations in electronic resistance in relation to the magnetic flux, which is now known as the Little–Parks effect. This means the quantization of the flux, and is one of the early experimental evidences of the formation of Cooper pairs in the BCS theory.

In 1964, he proposed a superconducting mechanism based on the electronic excitation of polarizable molecules, such as conductive polyene spines, and predicted that the critical temperature would exceed room temperature by a large margin. This report attracted many physicists and chemists, facilitating the theoretical study of excitonic superconductivity and the synthesis of organic conductors and superconductors.

== Awards ==
Little was elected a Fellow of the American Physical Society in 1961.

In 2006, he received an R&D 100 Award for air-liquid nitrogen products developed by his company. He was awarded the Samuel C. Collins Award in 2007 and the Albert Nelson Marquis Lifetime Achievement Award in 2017.
