= Kohn–Luttinger superconductivity =

Theoretical mechanism for unconventional superconductivity

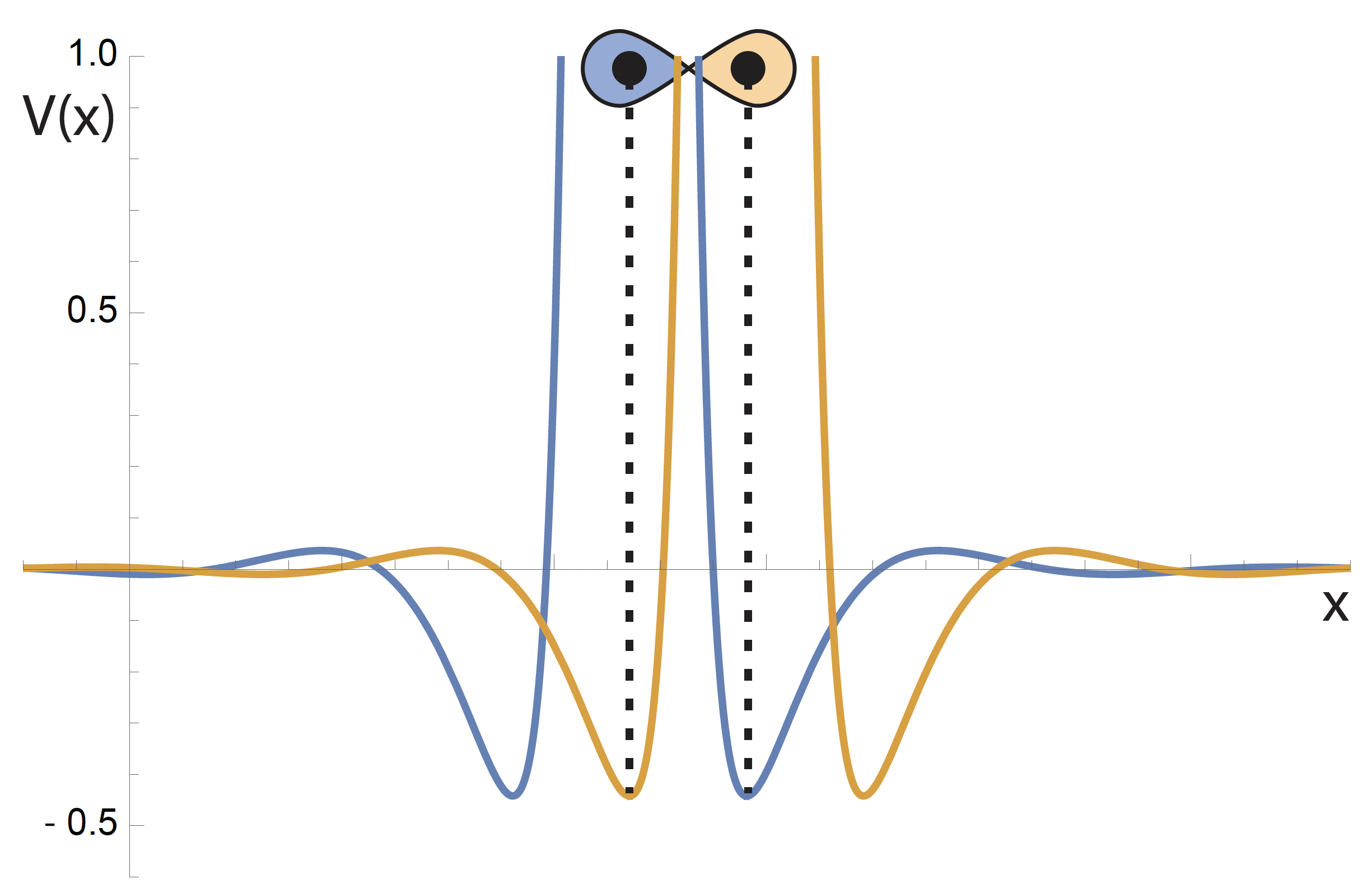
Schematic illustration of mechanism for Kohn-Luttinger superconductivity with p-wave Cooper pair condensation. Over-screening of Coulomb interaction leads to attractive regions at radii on the order of $1/k_F$ where electrons can condense.

Kohn–Luttinger superconductivity is a theoretical mechanism for unconventional superconductivity proposed by Walter Kohn and Joaquin Mazdak Luttinger based on Friedel oscillations. In contrast to BCS theory, in which Cooper pairs are formed due to Bardeen–Pines interaction between electrons and phonons, Kohn–Luttinger mechanism is based on fact that screened Coulomb interaction oscillates as $\cos(2k_F r + \phi)/r^3$ and can create Cooper instability for non-zero angular momentum $\ell$.

Since Kohn–Luttinger mechanism does not require any additional interactions beyond Coulomb interactions, it can lead to superconductivity in any electronic system. However, the estimated critical temperature, $T_{\rm c}$, for Kohn–Luttinger superconductor is exponential in $-\ell^4$ and thus is extremely small. For example, for metals the critical temperature is given by

$$\frac{k_{\rm B} T_{\rm c}}{E_{\rm F}} = e^{-(2 \ell )^4},$$

where $k_{\rm B}$ is Boltzmann constant and $E_{\rm F}$ is Fermi energy. For a typical 3D metal with a spherical Fermi surface Kohn and Luttinger estimated that $T_c\sim 10^{-3}~\mathrm{K}$. However, non-spherical Fermi surfaces and variation of parameters may enhance the effect. Indeed, it is proposed that Kohn–Luttinger mechanism is responsible for superconductivity in rhombohedral trilayer graphene, which has an annular Fermi surface.
