= David Pines =

American quantum physicist (1924–2018)

- Born: June 8, 1924; Kansas City, Missouri
- Died: May 3, 2018 (aged 93); Urbana, Illinois
- Citizenship: American
- Education: University of California, Berkeley (A.B.); Princeton University (Ph.D.)
- Known for: Nuclear pairing Plasmon; Random phase approximation Bardeen–Pines interaction Hugenholtz–Pines theorem Pines' demon
- Awards: Lilienfeld Prize (2016); Feenberg Medal (1985); UNSW Dirac Medal (1985); Racah Lecture (1974); Fritz London Lecture (1973); Guggenheim Fellowship (1962)
- Scientific career
- Fields: Physics
- Workplaces: Princeton University; Institute for Advanced Study; UIUC; University of California, Davis
- Thesis: The role of plasma oscillations in electron interactions (1951)
- Doctoral advisor: David Bohm
- Doctoral students: Philippe Nozières
- Other notable students: Anthony J. Leggett

David Pines (June 8, 1924 – May 3, 2018) was a US physicist recognized for his work in quantum many-body systems in condensed matter and nuclear physics. With his advisor David Bohm, he contributed to the understanding of electron interactions in metals. Bohm and Pines introduced the plasmon, the quantum of electron density oscillations in metals. They pioneered the use of the random phase approximation. His work with John Bardeen, the Bardeen–Pines interaction between electrons and phonons led to the development of the BCS theory of superconductivity. Pines extended BCS theory to nuclear physics to explain stability of isotopes with even and odd numbers of nucleons. He also used the theory of superfluidity to explain the glitches in neutron stars.

Pines was a promoter of the concept of emergence in physics.

== Early life ==
David Pines was born to Sidney Pines, a mechanical engineer, and Edith Pines (née Adelman). He graduated from Highland Park High School in Dallas in 1940, and then studied at Black Mountain College for one year before enrolling at the University of California, Berkeley

Pines earned a bachelor's degree in physics from UC Berkeley in 1944, and began graduate work there. His studies were interrupted after his first semester when he was drafted into the navy. He served for two years, and then followed J. Robert Oppenheimer, who had served as a mentor at Berkeley, to Princeton University in 1947. He earned his Ph.D. at Princeton under David Bohm in 1950.

== Research and academic positions ==
Pines was the founding director of the Institute for Complex Adaptive Matter (ICAM) and the International Institute for Complex Adaptive Matter (I2CAM) (respectively, United States-wide and international institutions dedicated to research in and the understanding of emergent phenomena), distinguished professor of physics, University of California, Davis, research professor of physics and professor emeritus of physics and electrical and computer engineering in the Center for Advanced Study, University of Illinois at Urbana–Champaign (UIUC), and a staff member in the office of the Materials, Physics, and Applications Division at the Los Alamos National Laboratory.

He was the founding director of the Center for Advanced Study, UIUC (1968–70), was vice-president of the Aspen Center for Physics from 1968 to 1972, founder and co-chair of the US-USSR Cooperative Program in Physics, 1968–89; and a co-founder, vice-president, chair of the board of trustees, and co-chair of the science board of the Santa Fe Institute, from 1982 to 1996.

He was the organizer or co-organizer of fifteen workshops and two summer schools of theoretical physics, was an honorary trustee and honorary member of the Aspen Center for Physics, and a member of the board of overseers at Sabancı University in Istanbul.

Here is a list:

- Instructor, University of Pennsylvania 1950–52
- Research assistant professor, UIUC 1952–55
- Assistant professor, Princeton University 1955–58
- Member, Institute for Advanced Study 1958–59
- Professor of physics & electrical engineering, UIUC 1959–1995
- Professeur Associe, Faculte des Sciences, Université de Paris 1962–63
- Founding director, Center for Advanced Study, UIUC 1967–70
- Visiting professor, NORDITA 1970
- Visiting scientist, Academy of Sciences, USSR 1970 and 1978
- Visiting scientist, Academy of Sciences, China 1973
- Exchange professor, Université de Paris 1978
- Professor, Center for Advanced Study, UIUC 1978–1990
- Visiting scientist, Hungarian Academy of Sciences 1979
- Gordon Godfrey Professor, University of New South Wales 1985
- B. T. Matthias Visiting Scholar (Los Alamos National Laboratory) 1986
- Professor, College de France 1989
- Center for Advanced Study professor of physics and electrical computer engineering, UIUC 1990–1995
- External professor, Santa Fe Institute 1989–2002
- Robert Maxwell Professor, Santa Fe Institute 1991
- S. Ulam Visiting Scholar, Los Alamos National Laboratory 1996–97
- Visiting professor, Royal Institute of Technology, Stockholm, 1998
- Visiting fellow-commoner, Trinity College, University of Cambridge 2000

=== Editorial contributions ===
- Founding editor, Frontiers in Physics, 1961–present
- Editor, Reviews of Modern Physics 1973–96

=== Educational and public service ===
- Co-founder of the Center for Advanced Study, UIUC, 1967; the Aspen Center for Physics, 1967–69; the US-USSR Cooperative Program in Physics, 1968; the Santa Fe Institute, 1982–84; and the Institute for Complex Adaptive Matter, 1998–1999
- Organizer or co-organizer of fifteen workshops and two summer schools of theoretical physics
- Aspen Center for Physics: vice-president, 1968–72;
- Board of trustees 1968–80; honorary trustee, 1980-; member, 1980-2018
- Santa Fe Institute: co-founder, 1984; vice-president,
- 1984–86; board of trustees, 1984–2002; chair, board of trustees, 1986–87; founding co-chair, science board, 1987–96; member, science board, 1987–1999; 2001-; external faculty 1995-2018
- Institute for Complex Adaptive Matter: founding director and member of board of trustees (now board of governors) and science steering committee, 1999–2018
- National Academy of Sciences; chair, Panel on Condensed Matter Physics, 1994–98
- National Academy of Sciences/National Research Council:
- Physics Survey Committee, 1965–66;
- Board on International Scientific Exchange, founder and chair, 1973–1977
- US/USSR Workshops in Condensed Matter Theory, founder and co-chair, 1968; 1970; 1974; 1978; 1988
- US/USSR Commission on Cooperation in Physics, founder and co-chair, 1975–80
- American Academy of Arts and Sciences: chair, physics section and class membership committee, 1996–99
- Los Alamos National Laboratory:
- T Division Advisory Committee: member 1975–82; chair, 1977–1982
- Institute for Defense Analyses, mentor, Defense Sciences Study Group, 1985–2000

== Late life ==
Pines died on May 3, 2018, due to pancreatic cancer.

== Research interests ==
In 1956, Pines predicted the existence of electronic modes where electrons in different bands move coherently out of phase, which he dubbed "demon" modes, after James Clerk Maxwell, since he thought he "lived too early to have a particle or excitation named in his honor." Although Pines justified his etymological choice by making the term a half backronym (from D.E.M., which he claimed stood for "distinct electron motion"), the phenomenon is unrelated to Maxwell's statistical mechanics demon. Pines' demon should not be confused with the more common acoustic plasmon which arise from low dimensionality in, for example, 2D- or quasi-2D-materials. In comparison, the demon arises only in multiband materials through opposing currents from different electronic bands, and is not tied to a particular dimensionality. His prediction of the demon was first observed experimentally in 2023 in strontium ruthenate.

His latest research topics concerned the search for the organizing principles responsible for emergent behavior in materials where unexpectedly new classes of behavior emerge in response to the strong and competing interactions among their elementary constituents. Some recent research results on correlated electron materials are the development of a consistent phenomenological description of protected magnetic behavior in the pseudogap state of underdoped cuprate superconductors and the discovery of the protected emergence of itinerancy in the Kondo lattice in heavy electron materials and its description using a two-fluid model. He remained interested in the superfluidity of neutron stars revealed by pulsar glitches and in elementary excitations in the helium liquids.

== Awards and honors ==
His seminal contributions to the theory of many-body systems and to theoretical astrophysics were recognized by two Guggenheim Fellowships, the Feenberg Medal, the Edward A. Frieman Prize for Excellence in Graduate Student Research, Dirac and Drucker prizes, and by his election to the National Academy of Sciences, American Philosophical Society, American Academy of Arts and Sciences, Russian Academy of Sciences, and Hungarian Academy of Sciences and visiting professorships at the California Institute of Technology, College de France, Trinity College, Cambridge, University of Leiden, and the Université de Paris.

David Pines was a member and fellow of:

- Member, National Academy of Sciences
- Member, American Philosophical Society
- Fellow, American Academy of Arts and Sciences
- Foreign member, Russian Academy of Sciences
- Honorary member, Hungarian Academy of Sciences
- Fellow, American Association for Advancement of Science
- Fellow, American Physical Society
- National Science Foundation Senior Postdoctoral Fellow in Copenhagen and Paris 1957–58
- John Simon Guggenheim Memorial Fellow 1962–63 and 1970–71

During his life he received many awards including:

- Lorentz Professor, Leiden University 1971
- Fritz London Memorial Lecturer (Duke University) 1972
- Giulio Racah Memorial Lecturer (Hebrew University of Jerusalem) 1974
- Marchon Lecturer (Newcastle University) 1976
- Sherman Fairchild Distinguished Scholar (Caltech) 1977
- Eugene Feenberg Memorial Lecturer (Washington University in St. Louis) 1982
- Eastman Kodak - University of Rochester Distinguished Lecturer 1983
- Friemann Prize in Condensed Matter Physics 1983
- Dirac Medal for the Advancement of Theoretical Physics (University of New South Wales) 1985
- Emil Warburg Lecturer (University of Bayreuth) 1985
- Eugene Feenberg Medal 1985
- Daniel C. Drucker Eminent Faculty Award 1994
- John Bardeen Prize for Superconductivity Theory 2009
- Julius Edgar Lilienfeld Prize 2016

== Books ==
- The Many-Body Problem. (W. A. Benjamin: N.Y) 456 pp. (1961) (Russian translation, State Publishing House, Moscow, 1963)
- Elementary Excitations in Solids. (W. A. Benjamin: N. Y.) 312 pp. (1963) (Russian translation, State Publishing House, Moscow, 1965). Japanese translation (Syokabo Press, Tokyo, 1974)
- The Theory of Quantum Liquids, Vol. I Normal Fermi Liquids. W. A. Benjamin: NY, 1, 355 pp. (1966). (Russian Translation, Publishing House MIR, Moscow, 1968)
- Pines, David; Anderson, Philip W.; Arrow, Kenneth J., eds. (1988). The economy as an evolving complex system: the proceedings of the Evolutionary Paths of the Global Economy Workshop, held September, 1987 in Santa Fe, New Mexico. Redwood City, California: Addison-Wesley Pub. Co. ISBN 9780201156850. Book details.
- The Theory of Quantum Liquids Vol. II: Superfluid Bose Liquids (with P. Nozières), Addison-Wesley, 180pp (1990)
