= Random phase approximation =

Mathematical formalism used in quantum field theory

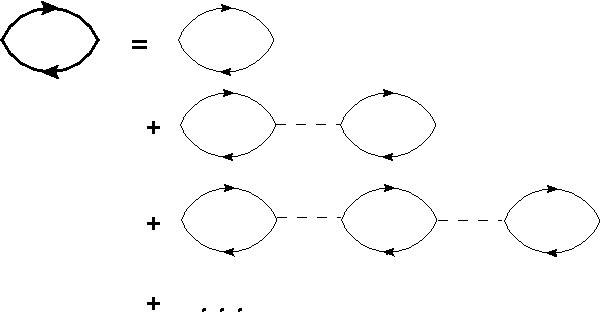
Bubble diagrams, which result in the RPA when summed up. Solid lines stand for interacting or non-interacting Green's functions, dashed lines for two-particle interactions.

The random phase approximation (RPA) is an approximation method in condensed matter physics and nuclear physics. It was first introduced by David Bohm and David Pines as an important result in a series of seminal papers of 1952 and 1953. For decades physicists had been trying to incorporate the effect of microscopic quantum mechanical interactions between electrons in the theory of matter. Bohm and Pines' RPA accounts for the weak screened Coulomb interaction and is commonly used for describing the dynamic linear electronic response of electron systems. It was further developed to the relativistic form (RRPA) by solving the Dirac equation.

In the RPA, electrons are assumed to respond only to the total electric potential V(r) which is the sum of the external perturbing potential V_{ext}(r) and a screening potential V_{sc}(r). The external perturbing potential is assumed to oscillate at a single frequency ω, so that the model yields via a self-consistent field (SCF) method a dynamic dielectric function denoted by ε_{RPA}(k, ω).

The contribution to the dielectric function from the total electric potential is assumed to average out, so that only the potential at wave vector k contributes. This is what is meant by the random phase approximation. The resulting dielectric function, also called the Lindhard dielectric function, correctly predicts a number of properties of the electron gas, including plasmons.

The RPA was criticized in the late 1950s for overcounting the degrees of freedom and the call for justification led to intense work among theoretical physicists. In a seminal paper Murray Gell-Mann and Keith Brueckner showed that the RPA can be derived from a summation of leading-order chain Feynman diagrams in a dense electron gas.

In superconductivity, RPA can be used to derive the Bardeen–Pines interaction between phonons and electrons that leads to Cooper pairing.

The consistency in these results became an important justification and motivated a very strong growth in theoretical physics in the late 50s and 60s.

== Applications ==
=== Ground state of an interacting bosonic system ===
The RPA vacuum $\left|\mathrm{RPA}\right\rangle$ for a bosonic system can be expressed in terms of non-correlated bosonic vacuum $\left|\mathrm{MFT}\right\rangle$ and original boson excitations $\mathbf{a}_{i}^{\dagger}$

$$\left|\mathrm{RPA}\right\rangle=\mathcal{N}\mathbf{e}^{Z_{ij}\mathbf{a}_{i}^{\dagger}\mathbf{a}_{j}^{\dagger}/2}\left|\mathrm{MFT}\right\rangle$$

where Z is a symmetric matrix with $|Z|\leq 1$ and

$$\mathcal{N}= \frac{\left\langle  \mathrm{MFT}\right|\left.\mathrm{RPA}\right\rangle}{\left\langle  \mathrm{MFT}\right|\left.\mathrm{MFT}\right\rangle}$$

The normalization can be calculated by

$$\langle
\mathrm{RPA}|\mathrm{RPA}\rangle=
\mathcal{N}^2 \langle \mathrm{MFT}|
\mathbf{e}^{z_{i}(\tilde{\mathbf{q}}_{i})^2/2}
\mathbf{e}^{z_{j}(\tilde{\mathbf{q}}^{\dagger}_{j})^2/2}
| \mathrm{MFT}\rangle=1$$

where $Z_{ij}=(X^{\mathrm{t}})_{i}^{k} z_{k} X^{k}_{j}$ is the singular value decomposition of $Z_{ij}$. $\tilde{\mathbf{q}}^{i}=(X^{\dagger})^{i}_{j}\mathbf{a}^{j}$

$$\mathcal{N}^{-2}=
\sum_{m_{i}}\sum_{n_{j}}  \frac{(z_{i}/2)^{m_{i}}(z_{j}/2)^{n_{j}}}{m!n!}
\langle \mathrm{MFT}|
\prod_{i\,j}
(\tilde{\mathbf{q}}_{i})^{2 m_{i}}
(\tilde{\mathbf{q}}^{\dagger}_{j})^{2 n_{j}}
| \mathrm{MFT}\rangle$$

$$=\prod_{i}
\sum_{m_{i}} (z_{i}/2)^{2 m_{i}} \frac{(2 m_{i})!}{m_{i}!^2}=$$

$$\prod_{i}\sum_{m_{i}} (z_{i})^{2 m_{i}} {1/2 \choose m_{i}}=\sqrt{\det(1-|Z|^2)}$$

the connection between new and old excitations is given by

$$\tilde{\mathbf{a}}_{i}=\left(\frac{1}{\sqrt{1-Z^2}}\right)_{ij}\mathbf{a}_{j}+
\left(\frac{1}{\sqrt{1-Z^2}}Z\right)_{ij}\mathbf{a}^{\dagger}_{j}$$.
