= Pines' demon =

Quasiparticle in condensed matter physics

In condensed matter physics, Pines' demon or, simply demon is a collective excitation of electrons which corresponds to electrons in different energy bands moving out of phase with each other. Equivalently, a demon corresponds to counter-propagating currents of electrons from different bands. Named after David Pines, who coined the term in 1956, demons are quantum mechanical excited states of a material belonging to a broader class of exotic collective excitations, such as the magnon, phason, or exciton. Pines' demon was first experimentally observed in 2023 by A. A. Husain et al. within the transition-metal oxide distrontium ruthenate (Sr_{2}RuO_{4}).

== History ==
Demons were originally theorized in 1956 by David Pines in the context of multiband metals with two energy bands: a heavy electron band with large effective mass $m_d$ and a light electron band with effective mass $m_s$. In the limit of $m_d \gg m_s$, the two bands are kinematically decoupled, so electrons in one band are unable to scatter to the other band while conserving momentum and energy. Within this limit, Pines pointed out that the two bands can be thought of as two distinct species of charge particles, so that it becomes possible for excitations of the two bands to be either in-phase or out-of-phase with each other. The in-phase excitation of the two bands was not a new type of excitation, it was simply the plasmon, an excitation proposed earlier by David Pines and David Bohm in 1952 which explained peaks observed in early electron energy-loss spectra of solids. The out-of-phase excitation was termed the "demon" by Pines after James Clerk Maxwell, since he thought Maxwell "lived too early to have a particle or excitation named in his honor." Pines explained his terminology by making the term a half backronym because particles commonly have suffix "-on" and the excitation involved distinct electron motion, resulting in D.E.M.on, or simply demon for short.

The demon was historically referred to as an acoustic plasmon, due to its gapless nature which is also shared with acoustic phonons. However, with the rise of two-dimensional materials (such as graphene) and surface plasmons, the term acoustic plasmon has taken on a very different meaning as the ordinary plasmon in a low-dimensional system. Such acoustic plasmons are distinct from the demon because they do not consist of out-of-phase currents from different bands, do not exist in bulk materials, and do couple to light, unlike the demon. A more detailed comparison of plasmons and demons is shown in the table below.

The demon excitation, unlike the plasmon, was only discovered many decades later in 2023 by A. A. Husain et al. in the unconventional superconducting material Sr_{2}RuO_{4} using a momentum-resolved variant of high-resolution electron energy-loss spectroscopy.

== Relationship with the plasmon ==
The plasmon is a quantized vibration of the charge density in a material where all electron bands move in-phase. The plasmon is also massive (i.e., has an energy gap) in bulk materials due to the energy cost needed to overcome the long-ranged Coulomb interaction, with the energy cost being the plasma frequency $\omega_p$. Plasmons exist in all conducting materials and play a dominant role in shaping the dielectric function of a metal at optical frequencies. Historically, plasmons were observed as early as 1941 by G. Ruthemann. The behavior of plasmons has widespread implications, as they play a role as a tool for biological microscopy (surface plasmon resonance microscopy), plasmon-based electronics (plasmonics), and underlay the original formulation of the transmission-line with a junction plasm on (transmon) device now used in superconducting qubits for quantum computing.

The demon excitation on the other hand holds a number key distinctions from the plasmon (and acoustic plasmon), as summarized in the table below.

Characteristic	Demon	Plasmon
Band structure	Only present in multiband metals and only well-defined when bands are decoupled to some degree	Present in both single-band and multiband metals
Dimensionality	Not tied to a specific dimensionality	Gapped in 3D materials, but gapless in lower dimensional materials, such as graphene, as an acoustic surface plasmon.
Long-ranged E-field	No	Yes
Contributes to $\epsilon(\omega)$	No	Yes, dominant contributor at optical frequencies
Coupling to light	No direct coupling to light	Can couple to, and even hybridize with, light under certain conditions (polaritons)
Energy gap	Gapless (or massless) - no energy cost at long wavelengths.	Gapped in bulk materials due to long-ranged Coulomb interaction.
Energy scale	Disperses on scale of $\omega \sim v_f k$	Gapped with dispersion of $\omega \sim \omega_p + O(k^2)$
Role in low-energy physics and phase transitions	Demons can play a more direct role in low-energy physics (e.g., superconductivity) due to their massless nature	Plasmons tend to not play a role in low-energy physics due to their energy gap.

== Theoretical significance ==
Early studies of the demon in the context of superconductivity showed, under the two band picture presented by Pines, that superconducting pairing of the light electron band can be enhanced through the existence of demons, while the pairing of the heavy electrons would be more or less unaffected. The implication being that demons would allow for orbital-selective effects on superconducting pairing. However, for the simple case of spherically symmetric metals with two bands, natural realizations of demon-enhanced superconductivity seemed unlikely, as the heavy (d-)electrons play the dominant role in superconductivity of most transition metal considered at the time. However, more recent studies on high-temperature superconducting metal hydrides, where light electron bands participate in superconductivity, suggest demons may be playing an active role in such systems.
