= Electron Pair Production =

Electron Pair Production may refer to:

- Cooper pairing of electrons in superconductor
- Electron-positron pair production
- Electron-hole pair generation in semiconductor
- Pairing of electrons on the same atomic or molecular orbital
