= Second sound =

Quantum mechanical phenomenon in which heat transfer occurs by wave-like motion

In condensed matter physics, second sound is a quantum mechanical phenomenon in which heat transfer occurs by wave-like motion, rather than by the more usual mechanism of diffusion. Its presence leads to a very high thermal conductivity. It is known as "second sound" because the wave motion of entropy and temperature is similar to the propagation of pressure waves in air (sound). The phenomenon of second sound was first described by Lev Landau in 1941.

== Description ==
Normal sound waves are fluctuations in the displacement and density of molecules in a substance; second sound waves are fluctuations in the density of quasiparticle thermal excitations (rotons and phonons). Second sound can be observed in any system in which most phonon-phonon collisions conserve momentum, like superfluids and in some dielectric crystals when Umklapp scattering is small.

Contrary to molecules in a gas, quasiparticles are not necessarily conserved. Also gas molecules in a box conserve momentum (except at the boundaries of box), while quasiparticles can sometimes not conserve momentum in the presence of impurities or Umklapp scattering. Umklapp phonon-phonon scattering exchanges momentum with the crystal lattice, so phonon momentum is not conserved, but Umklapp processes can be reduced at low temperatures.

Normal sound in gases is a consequence of the collision rate τ between molecules being large compared to the frequency of the sound wave ω ≪ 1/τ. For second sound, the Umklapp rate τ_{u} has to be small compared to the oscillation frequency ω ≫ 1/τ_{u} for energy and momentum conservation. However analogous to gasses, the relaxation time τ_{N} describing the collisions has to be large with respect to the frequency ω ≪ 1/τ_{N}, leaving a window:

$$\frac{1}{\tau_{\rm u}} \ll \omega\ll \frac{1}{\tau_N}$$

for sound-like behaviour or second sound. The second sound thus behaves as oscillations of the local number of quasiparticles (or of the local energy carried by these particles). Contrary to the normal sound where energy is related to pressure and temperature, in a crystal the local energy density is purely a function of the temperature. In this sense, the second sound can also be considered as oscillations of the local temperature. Second sound is a wave-like phenomenon which makes it very different from usual heat diffusion.

== In helium II ==
Second sound is observed in liquid helium at temperatures below the lambda point, 2.1768 K, where ^{4}He becomes a superfluid known as helium II. Helium II has the highest thermal conductivity of any known material (several hundred times higher than copper). Second sound can be observed either as pulses or in a resonant cavity.

The speed of second sound is close to zero near the lambda point, increasing to approximately 20 m/s around 1.8 K, about ten times slower than normal sound waves. At temperatures below 1 K, the speed of second sound in helium II increases as the temperature decreases.

Second sound is also observed in superfluid helium-3 below its lambda point 2.5 mK.

As per the two-fluid, the speed of second sound is given by

$c_2 = \left(\frac{TS^2}{C}\,\frac{\rho_s}{\rho_n}\right)^{1/2}$

where $T$ is the temperature, $S$ is the entropy, $C$ is the specific heat, $\rho_s$ is the superfluid density and $\rho_n$ is the normal fluid density. As $T\rightarrow 0$, $c_2=c/\sqrt{3}$, where $c=(\partial p/\partial \rho)_S\approx (\partial p/\partial \rho)_T$ is the ordinary (or first) sound speed.

== In other media ==
Second sound has been observed in solid ^{4}He and ^{3}He, and in some dielectric solids such as Bi in the temperature range of 1.2 to 4.0 K with a velocity of 780 ± 50 m/s, or solid sodium fluoride (NaF) around 10 to 20 K. In 2021 this effect was observed in a BKT superfluid as well as in a germanium semiconductor

=== In carbon thermal conductors and beyond ===
In 2019 it was reported that ordinary graphite exhibits second sound at around 120 K. This observation highlights that second sound is not restricted to exotic systems, but can also emerge in fast thermal conductors where momentum-conserving phonon scattering dominates. This feature was both theoretically predicted, where second sound and hydrodynamic heat transport were demonstrated in graphene and related two-dimensional materials, and was later captured within generalized transport frameworks such as the viscous heat equations, where hydrodynamic heat transport is described beyond Fourier diffusion. In these works, second sound and related hydrodynamic effects were discussed not only in graphene but also in other carbon-based systems, with predictions extending even to diamond in the appropriate regime. Second sound in graphite was subsequently confirmed experimentally and represents, to date, one of the highest temperatures at which this phenomenon has been observed.

However, this second sound is observed only at the microscale, because the wave dies out exponentially with characteristic length 1-10 microns. Therefore, presumably graphite in the right temperature regime has extraordinarily high thermal conductivity but only for the purpose of transferring heat pulses distances of order 10 microns, and for pulses of duration on the order of 10 nanoseconds. For more "normal" heat-transfer, graphite's observed thermal conductivity is less than that of, e.g., copper. The theoretical models, however, predict longer absorption lengths would be seen in isotopically pure graphite, and perhaps over a wider temperature range, e.g. even at room temperature (as of March 2019, that experiment has not yet been tried).

Recent developments have further enriched this picture: hydrodynamic transport in solids has been linked to phenomena such as thermal backflow and the formation of heat vortices, which are observable in the steady-state regime rather than only in transient dynamics. These results reinforce the view that wave-like and collective heat transport is a general feature of high-purity, high-conductivity materials.

== Applications ==
Measuring the speed of second sound in ^{3}He-^{4}He mixtures can be used as a thermometer in the range 0.01-0.7 K.

Oscillating superleak transducers (OST) use second sound to locate defects in superconducting accelerator cavities.

== Experimental observations ==
Researchers made significant advances in directly observing second sound in distinct quantum fluids. At the Massachusetts Institute of Technology (MIT), physicists visualized second sound in a unitary Fermi gas of ultracold lithium-6 atoms by tracking temperature-dependent resonant frequencies, enabling the first direct imaging of heat waves in such a dilute system. Furthermore, scientists at Université Grenoble Alpes developed a micromachined heater-thermometer system that enabled direct detection of second sound in superfluid helium-4, further validating the wave-like heat propagation in bosonic quantum fluids under controlled cryogenic conditions.

== See also ==
- Zero sound
- Third sound

== Bibliography ==
- Sinyan Shen, Surface Second Sound in Superfluid Helium. PhD Dissertation (1973). http://adsabs.harvard.edu/abs/1973PhDT.......142S
- V. Peshkov, "'Second Sound' in Helium II," J. Phys. (Moscow) 8, 381 (1944)
- U. Piram, "Numerical investigation of second sound in liquid helium," Dipl.-Ing. Dissertation (1991). Retrieved on April 15, 2007.
