= Gerasim Eliashberg =

Soviet theoretical physicist (1930–2021)

Gerasim Matveyevich Eliashberg
- Герасим Матвеевич Элиашберг
- Born: 26 July 1930; Leningrad, Russian SFSR, Soviet Union
- Died: 8 January 2021 (aged 90); Chernogolovka, Moscow Oblast, Russia
- Education: Leningrad State University
- Known for: Eliashberg theory Microwave-stimulated superconductivity
- Awards: Lenin centenary medal (1970); John Bardeen Prize (1994); Order of Honour (2006)
- Scientific career
- Fields: Theoretical physics
- Workplaces: Ioffe Physical-Technical Institute; Moscow Institute of Physics and Technology; Landau Institute for Theoretical Physics

Gerasim Matveyevich Eliashberg (Russian: Герасим Матвеевич Элиашберг; 26 July 1930 – 8 January 2021) was a Soviet theoretical physicist best known for developing the Eliashberg theory, a microscopic extension of the Bardeen–Cooper–Schrieffer (BCS) theory of superconductivity. He also made contributions related to Landau's Fermi-liquid theory, nonequilibrium superconductivity and other areas of condensed matter physics.

== Biography ==
Eliashberg was born on 26 July 1930 in Leningrad (now St. Petersburg) to Matvey Gerasimovich Eliashberg and Amalya Yakovlevna. His family, of Jewish origin, had moved from Dvinsk (present-day Daugavpils, Latvia) to St. Petersburg in 1907. His father was a chemical engineer, and worked as a director in the pulp and paper industry. As a teenager during the Second World War, Gerasim endured the Siege of Leningrad.

In 1947 he enrolled in the Faculty of Physics at Leningrad State University and graduated with honors in 1952. The growing antisemitic persecution in the Soviet Union prevented him from working as a scientist, and instead he worked at the Krasny Khimik ("Red Chemist") chemical plant for the next five years. During this period, he nevertheless managed to publish his first papers on theoretical physics.

Following Stalin's death in 1953 and the subsequent easing of restrictions, Eliashberg was admitted in 1959 to the Leningrad Physico-Technical Institute to begin doctoral studies in theoretical physics. He became a junior research scientist there in 1961 and defended his candidate's dissertation in 1963. A year later he relocated to Chernogolovka, a newly established science town about 50 kilometers outside Moscow. There he spent two years with the theoretical department of the Institute for Chemical Physics. In 1965 he joined the newly founded Institute of Theoretical Physics (later renamed the Landau Institute for Theoretical Physics) as a senior researcher, remaining there for the rest of his career. He earned his Doctor of Physical and Mathematical Sciences degree in 1972.

He died on 8 January 2021, in Chernogolovka, and was buried at the Makarovskoye Cemetery in the Moscow region.

He had two younger brothers, both of whom became scientists: electrical engineer Victor Eliashberg (born 1933) and mathematician Yakov Eliashberg (born 1946).

== Scientific work ==
In March and November 1960, Eliashberg published two papers on superconductivity that became classics in the field. In these works, he developed what is now known as the Eliashberg theory, a microscopic model of electron–phonon superconductivity that extended the Bardeen–Cooper–Schrieffer (BCS) theory. Building on Lev Gor'kov's Green's function formalism and Arkady Migdal's theory of electron–phonon interactions in the normal (non-superconducting) state, Eliashberg’s formulation provided a quantitative framework for strong-coupling superconductors. The work was immediately recognized as a major achievement, as it clarified the success and the limitations of the BCS model. It also provided a quantitative explanation of the phonon-related features observed in the tunneling spectra of lead, mercury and other strongly coupled superconductors. Eliashberg theory and its extensions have since become a standard tool for quantitative analysis of superconductivity in real materials and remains central to modern superconductivity research.

During his stay in the Leningrad Physico-Technical Institute, Eliashberg developed a method of analytical continuation that enables the calculation of frequency-dependent quantities with the Matsubara Green's function technique. He also generalized Landau's Fermi-liquid theory to finite temperatures, explaining the absence of zero sound in liquid helium-3 and predicting the conditions under which it could later be observed experimentally.

At the Landau Institute, Eliashberg made major contributions to nonequilibrium superconductivity, developing a microscopic kinetic theory of superconductors in external fields and predicting microwave-stimulated superconductivity, the amplification of superconductivity in a high-frequency field. The effect was later confirmed experimentally. In late 1960s and early 1970s, together with Lev Gor'kov, he derived a time-dependent generalization of Ginzburg–Landau theory. Also in collaboration with Lev Gor'kov, he formulated a theory describing an ensemble of small metallic particles, anticipating aspects of modern mesoscopic physics. He also investigated strongly interacting two-dimensional electron systems, spin and charge transport in materials without inversion symmetry, and other problems in condensed matter physics.

Eliashberg authored around 70 scientific publications. He taught at the Moscow Institute of Physics and Technology and supervised doctoral students there.

== Awards and honors ==
Eliashberg's contributions were recognized both nationally and internationally. In 1970 he received the Lenin centenary medal. He was elected a corresponding member of the Russian Academy of Sciences in 1990, and became a full member in 2000. In 1994 he was awarded, together with Anthony Leggett, the John Bardeen Prize for his work on pairing theory in strongly coupled superconductors. In 2006, Eliashberg received the Order of Honour of the Russian Federation.
