= Robert Hallock =

American physicist (b. 1943)

Robert B. Hallock
- Born: 1943 (age 82–83); Washington, D.C.
- Citizenship: US
- Education: University of Massachusetts Amherst; Stanford University
- Known for: Research in Low temperature physics
- Awards: Fellow of the American Physical Society (1981); Fritz London Memorial Prize (2025)
- Scientific career
- Fields: Condensed matter physics, Low temperature physics
- Workplaces: Stanford University; University of Massachusetts Amherst
- Doctoral advisor: William A. Little

Robert Bruce Hallock (born 1943) is an American physicist whose research primarily focuses on superfluidity, with a particular emphasis on the supertransport in helium films and imperfect helium crystals. He is Distinguished Professor Emeritus at the University of Massachusetts Amherst.

== Education and career ==
Robert B. Hallock was born in 1943, in Washington, D.C.. He received a B.S. in physics from the University of Massachusetts Amherst in 1965 and earned his Ph.D. in physics from the Stanford University in 1969, with William A. Little as his advisor. Following postdoctoral appointments at the Stanford University, Hallock returned to UMass Amherst in 1970, where he spent the remainder of his academic career. He retired in 2020.

== Research ==
Hallock is known for his work on superfluidity in helium films and through imperfect helium crystal.

He presented a demonstration of topological order in two-dimensional finite-temperature superfluids. He provided evidence of supertransport through solid helium-4. In the same series of experiments, he also observed the phenomenon of giant isochoric compressibility in solid helium-4, termed the “syringe” effect—a counterintuitive liquid-like response of the system’s density to a change in chemical potential at constant volume. Theoretical interpretation of the syringe effect in terms of the climb of edge dislocations with superfluid cores (the so-called “superclimb”) subsequently lead to the development of paradigm of transverse quantum fluid.

== Honors ==
In 1981, Hallock was elected a Fellow of the American Physical Society "for experimental studies of liquid helium contributing to the understanding of the structure of the bulk liquid and of the superfluid film." In 1992, he received a Guggenheim Fellowship. In 1992, he was also awarded the UMass Amherst Chancellor’s Medal, and in 2001 was named a Distinguished Professor. He was the recipient of the 2025 Fritz London Memorial Prize "for his many innovative achievements in the physics of liquid helium films and his pioneering work on supertransport in solid helium-4, which includes the paradigm-changing discovery of giant isochoric compressibility."
