= Superinsulator =

Material with infinite electrical resistivity

A superinsulator is a material that at low but finite temperatures does not conduct electricity, i.e. has an infinite resistance so that no electric current passes through it. The phenomenon of superinsulation can be regarded as an exact dual to superconductivity.

The superinsulating state can be destroyed by increasing the temperature and applying an external magnetic field and voltage. A superinsulator was first predicted by M. C. Diamantini, P. Sodano, and C. A. Trugenberger in 1996 who found a superinsulating ground state dual to superconductivity, emerging at the insulating side of the superconductor-insulator transition in the Josephson junction array due to electric-magnetic duality. Superinsulators were independently rediscovered by T. Baturina and V. Vinokur in 2008 on the basis of duality between two different symmetry realizations of the uncertainty principle and experimentally found in titanium nitride (TiN) films. The 2008 measurements revealed giant resistance jumps interpreted as manifestations of the voltage threshold transition to a superinsulating state which was identified as the low-temperature confined phase emerging below the charge Berezinskii-Kosterlitz-Thouless transition. These jumps were similar to earlier findings of the resistance jumps in indium oxide (InO) films. The finite-temperature phase transition into the superinsulating state was finally confirmed by Mironov et al. in NbTiN films in 2018.

Other researchers have seen the similar phenomenon in disordered indium oxide films.

== Mechanism ==
Both superconductivity and superinsulation rest on the pairing of conduction electrons into Cooper pairs. In superconductors, all the pairs move coherently, allowing for the electric current without resistance. In superinsulators, both Cooper pairs and normal excitations are confined and the electric current cannot flow. A mechanism behind superinsulation is the proliferation of magnetic monopoles at low temperatures. In two dimensions (2D), magnetic monopoles are quantum tunneling events (instantons) that are often referred to as monopole "plasma". In three dimensions (3D), monopoles form a Bose-Einstein condensate. Monopole plasma or monopole condensate squeezes Faraday's electric field lines into thin electric flux filaments or strings dual to Abrikosov vortices in superconductors. Cooper pairs of opposite charges at the end of these electric strings feel an attractive linear potential. When the corresponding string tension is large, it is energetically favorable to pull out of vacuum many charge-anticharge pairs and to form many short strings rather than to continue stretching the original one. As a consequence, only neutral "electric pions" exist as asymptotic states and the electric conduction is absent. This mechanism is a single-color version of the confinement mechanism that binds quarks into hadrons.

Because the electric forces are much weaker than strong forces of the particle physics, the typical size of "electric pions" well exceeds the size of corresponding elementary particles. This implies that preparing the samples that are sufficiently small, one can peer inside an "electric pion," where electric strings are loose and Coulomb interactions are screened, hence electric charges are effectively unbound and move as if they were in the metal. The low-temperature saturation of the resistance to metallic behavior has been observed in TiN films with small lateral dimensions.

== Future applications ==
Superinsulators could potentially be used as a platform for high-performance sensors and logical units. Combined with superconductors, superinsulators could be used to create switching electrical circuits with no energy loss as heat.
