= Philippe Nozières =

French physicist (1932–2022)

- Born: April 12, 1932
- Died: June 15, 2022 (aged 90)
- Education: École Normale Supérieure; Princeton University
- Awards: Prix Paul Langevin (1960); CNRS Silver Medal (1961); Holweck Prize (1974); Wolf Prize in Physics (1984/85); CNRS Gold medal (1988); Feenberg Medal (2001)
- Scientific career
- Fields: Quantum mechanics
- Workplaces: University of Paris; University of Grenoble; Institut Laue-Langevin
- Doctoral advisor: David Pines

Philippe Pierre Gaston François Nozières (12 April 1932 – 15 June 2022) was a French physicist working at Institut Laue-Langevin in Grenoble, France. He earned the Wolf Prize in Physics for his theory of electrons in metals.

== Life ==
=== Early years and education ===
Philippe Nozières was born on 12 April 1932 in Paris.

In 1952, Nozières began his scientific career working on semiconductor experiments in the group of Pierre Aigrain at the École Normale Supérieure in Paris. He wrote a master's thesis on the point-contact transistor. In 1955, received a fellowship study with David Pines at Princeton University, working on many-body theory. He spent the summer of 1956 at Bell Labs, where he exchanged ideas with a variety of condensed matter theorists, including Philip W. Anderson and Walter Kohn He received his Ph.D. from the University of Paris in 1957 for the work he carried out at Princeton.

=== Career ===
In 1957 Nozières was appointed the assistant director of the physics laboratory at the École Normale Supérieure. In 1958 his academic career was interrupted when he was drafted by the French navy. He spent 2 years working on seismic detectors intended to sense atomic explosions. After leaving the navy in 1961, he became a professor at the University of Paris. He left Paris to join the Institut Laue-Langevin in Grenoble in 1972, and would continue to be associated with this institution for the rest of his career. In 1976 he became a professor at the University of Grenoble. In 1983 he became a professor at the Collège de France.

Nozières died on 15 June 2022, aged 90.

== Research ==
Nozières' work was concerned with various facets of the many-body problem. He made major contributions to understanding the fundamental theory of solids, especially to the behavior of electrons in metals. In a short period he contributed profoundly to the concept of quasiparticles and its relation to Fermi liquids, to the dynamics of local systems in metals and to irreversible phenomena in quantum physics. Through his book (N-body problem) and his research, he established a French school in solid state physics the influence of which extends all over the world. His later work focused on crystal growth and surface physics.

== Awards ==
Nozières was recognized with a variety of awards for his seminal work. In 1988 he received the CNRS Gold medal. In 1984/85 he was awarded the Wolf Prize in Physics, along with Conyers Herring of Stanford University, for "their major contributions to the fundamental theory of solids, especially of the behaviour of electrons in metals". In 1974 he won the F. Holweck Prize. In 1961 he won the CNRS Silver Medal and in 1960 the Prix Langevin from the Societé Française de Physique.

In 1989 he became a Commandeur de l'Ordre National du Mérite. He was a member of the French Academy of Sciences and a foreign associate of the US National Academy of Sciences.
