= Rollin film =

Liquid film of superfluid helium

Helium II will "creep" along surfaces in order to find its own level – after a short while, the levels in the two containers will equalize. The Rollin film also covers the interior of the larger container; if it were not sealed, the helium II would creep out and escape.

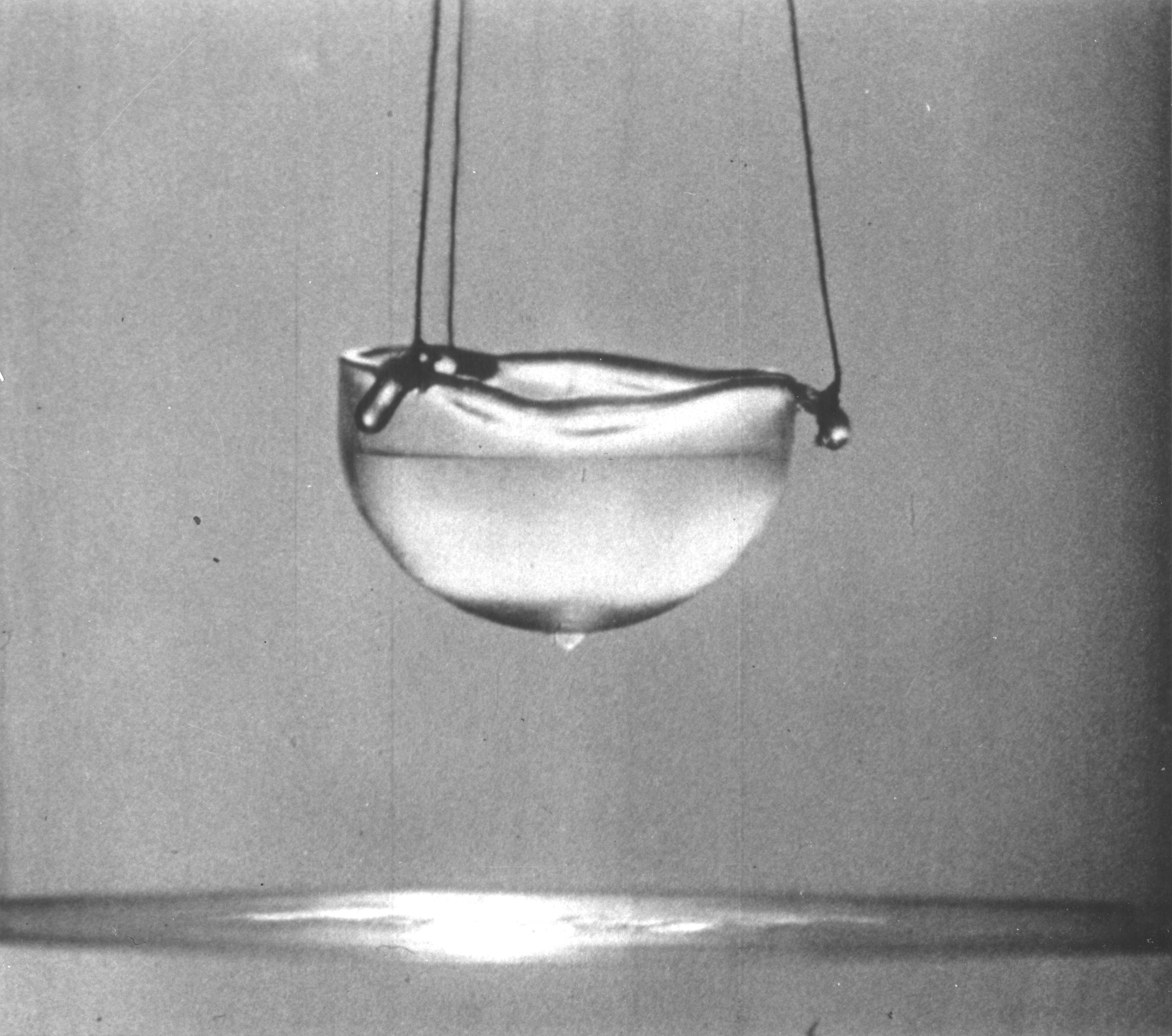
The liquid helium is in the superfluid phase. As long as it remains superfluid, it creeps up the inside wall of the cup as a thin film. It comes down on the outside, forming a drop which will fall into the liquid below. Another drop will form – and so on – until the cup is empty.

A Rollin film, named after Bernard V. Rollin, is a 30 nm-thick liquid film of helium in the helium II state. It exhibits a "creeping" effect in response to surfaces extending past the film's level (wave propagation). Helium II can escape from any non-closed container via creeping toward and eventually evaporating from capillaries of 10 to 100 nm or greater.

Rollin films are involved in the fountain effect where superfluid helium leaks out of a container in a fountain-like manner. They have high thermal conductivity.

The ability of superfluid liquids to cross obstacles that lie at a higher level is often referred to as the Onnes effect, named after Heike Kamerlingh Onnes. The Onnes effect is enabled by the capillary forces dominating gravity and viscous forces.

Waves propagating across a Rollin film are governed by the same equation as gravity waves in shallow water, but rather than gravity, the restoring force is the van der Waals force. The film suffers a change in chemical potential when the thickness varies. These waves are known as third sound.

== Thickness of the film ==
The thickness of the film can be calculated by the energy balance. Consider a small fluid volume element $\Delta V$ which is located at a height $h$ from the free surface. The potential energy due to the gravitational force acting on the fluid element is $\rho g h\Delta V$, where $\rho$ is the total density and $g$ is the gravitational acceleration. The quantum kinetic energy per particle is $\hbar^2/(2ml^2)$, where $l$ is the thickness of the film and $m$ is the mass of the particle. Therefore, the net kinetic energy is given by $\hbar^2 f\rho \Delta V/(2m^2l^2)$, where $f$ is the fraction of atoms which are Bose–Einstein condensate. Minimizing the total energy with respect to the thickness provides us the value of the thickness:

$$l = \frac{\hbar}{m}\sqrt{\frac{f}{2gh}}.$$

== See also ==
- Zero sound
- Second sound
