= Friedel oscillations =

Screening phenomenon in metals

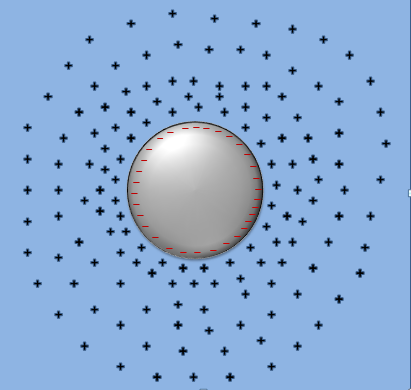
Screening of negatively charged particle in a pool of positive ions

In solid-state physics, Friedel oscillations in the surface of a solid arise from localized perturbations in a metallic or semiconductor system caused by a defect in the Fermi gas or Fermi liquid. Friedel oscillations are a quantum mechanical analog to electric charge screening of charged species in a pool of ions. Whereas electrical charge screening utilizes a point entity treatment to describe the make-up of the ion pool, Friedel oscillations describing fermions in a Fermi fluid or Fermi gas require a quasi-particle or a scattering treatment. Such oscillations depict a characteristic exponential decay in the fermionic density near the perturbation followed by an ongoing sinusoidal decay resembling sinc function.

The phenomenon is named after Jacques Friedel, who predicted the effect in 1952.

== Descriptions ==
=== One-dimensional electron gas ===
Friedel oscillations of the electron density in 1D electron gas occupying the half-space $x > 0$. Here, $n_0 = 2k_{\rm F}/ \pi$, and $k_{\rm F}$ is the Fermi wave vector.

As a simple model, consider one-dimensional electron gas in a half-space $x > 0$. The electrons do not penetrate into the half-space $x \leq 0$, so that the boundary condition for the electron wave function is $\psi(x = 0) = 0$. The oscillating wave functions that satisfy this condition are

$$\psi_k(x) = \sqrt{\frac{2}{L}}\sin kx$$,

where $k>0$ is the electron wave vector, and $L$ is the length of the one-dimensional box (we use the 'box" normalization here). We consider degenerate electron gas, so that the electrons fill states with energies less than the Fermi energy $E_{\rm F}$. Then, the electron density $n(x)$ is calculated as

$$n(x) = 2 \sum_{k<k_F} |\psi_k(x)|^2$$,

where summation is taken over all wave vectors less than the Fermi wave vector $k_{\rm F} = \sqrt{2mE_{\rm F}/\hbar^2}$, the factor 2 accounts for the spin degeneracy. By transforming the sum over $k$ into the integral we obtain

$$n(x) = 2 \frac{L}{\pi} \int \limits_0^{k_{\rm F}} |\psi_k(x)|^2 dk = \frac{2k_{\rm F}}{\pi}\left(1 - \frac{\sin 2 k_{\rm F} x}{2 k_{\rm F} x} \right)$$.

We see that the boundary perturbs the electron density leading to its spatial oscillations with the period $\lambda_{\rm F} = \pi/k_{\rm F}$ near the boundary. These oscillations decay into the bulk with the decay length also given by $\lambda_{\rm F}$. At $x \to +\infty$ the electron density equals to the unperturbed density of the one-dimensional electron gas $2k_{\rm F}/\pi$.

=== Scattering description ===
The electrons that move through a metal or semiconductor behave like free electrons of a Fermi gas with a plane wave-like wave function, that is

$$\psi_{\mathbf{k}}(\mathbf{r}) = \frac{1}{\sqrt{\Omega}} e^{i \mathbf{k} \cdot \mathbf{r}}$$.

Electrons in a metal behave differently than particles in a normal gas because electrons are fermions and they obey Fermi–Dirac statistics. This behaviour means that every k-state in the gas can only be occupied by two electrons with opposite spin. The occupied states fill a sphere in the band structure k-space, up to a fixed energy level, the so-called Fermi energy. The radius of the sphere in k-space, k_{F}, is called the Fermi wave vector.

If there is a foreign atom embedded in the metal or semiconductor, a so-called impurity, the electrons that move freely through the solid are scattered by the deviating potential of the impurity. During the scattering process the initial state wave vector k_{i} of the electron wave function is scattered to a final state wave vector k_{f}. Because the electron gas is a Fermi gas only electrons with energies near the Fermi level can participate in the scattering process because there must be empty final states for the scattered states to jump to. Electrons that are too far below the Fermi energy E_{F} can't jump to unoccupied states. The states around the Fermi level that can be scattered occupy a limited range of k-values or wavelengths. So only electrons within a limited wavelength range near the Fermi energy are scattered resulting in a density modulation around the impurity of the form

$\rho(\mathbf{r}) = \rho_0 + \delta n \frac{\cos(2 k_{\rm F}|\mathbf{r}| + \delta)}{|\mathbf{r}|^3}$.

=== Qualitative description ===
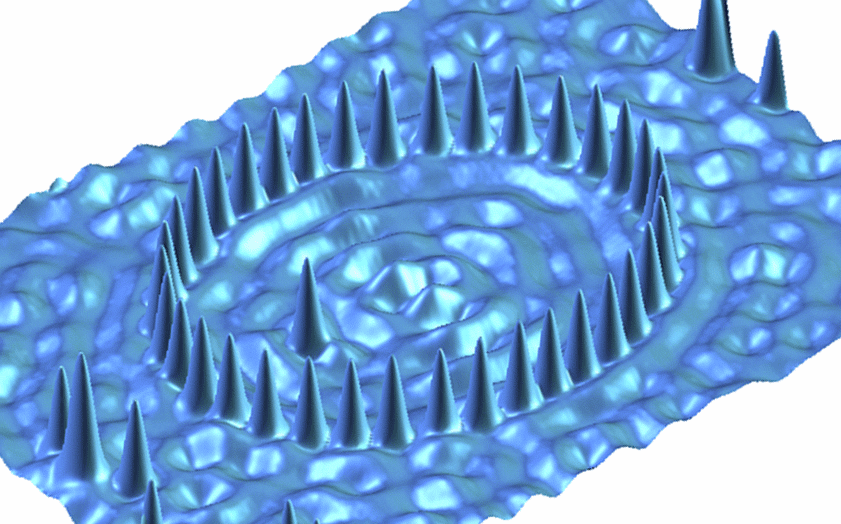
Scanning tunneling microscopy image of an elliptical quantum corral built by Co atoms on a Cu surface.

In the classic scenario of electric charge screening, a dampening in the electric field is observed in a mobile charge-carrying fluid upon the presence of a charged object. Since electric charge screening considers the mobile charges in the fluid as point entities, the concentration of these charges with respect to distance away from the point decreases exponentially. This phenomenon is governed by Poisson–Boltzmann equation. The quantum mechanical description of a perturbation in a one-dimensional Fermi fluid is modelled by the Tomonaga-Luttinger liquid. The fermions in the fluid that take part in the screening cannot be considered as a point entity but a wave-vector is required to describe them. Charge density away from the perturbation is not a continuum but fermions arrange themselves at discrete spaces away from the perturbation. This effect is the cause of the circular ripples around the impurity.

N.B. Where classically near the charged perturbation an overwhelming number of oppositely charged particles can be observed, in the quantum mechanical scenario of Friedel oscillations periodic arrangements of oppositely charged fermions followed by spaces with same charged regions.

In the figure to the right, a 2-dimensional Friedel oscillations has been illustrated with a scanning tunneling microscope image of a clean surface. As the image is taken on a surface, the regions of low electron density leave the atomic nuclei 'exposed' which result in a net positive charge.

== Experimental observation ==
Spatial imaging of the Friedel oscillations in the density of states by a scanning tunneling microscope is called quasiparticle interference imaging and can be used to obtain information about the electronic structure.

Friedel oscillations were first observed directly in gold and copper surfaces in 1993.

In 2020, magnetic Friedel oscillations were observed on a metal surface.

== Superconductivity ==
Friedel oscillations allow for the coupling of electrons into Cooper pairs without lattice interactions. This phenomenon is known as Kohn–Luttinger superconductivity.

== See also ==
- Lindhard theory
