= Zero sound =

Collective excitation in a Fermi liquid

Zero sound is the name given by Lev Landau in 1957 to the unique quantum vibrations in quantum Fermi liquids. The zero sound can no longer be thought of as a simple wave of compression and rarefaction, but rather a fluctuation in space and time of the quasiparticles' momentum distribution function. As the shape of Fermi distribution function changes slightly (or largely), zero sound propagates in the direction for the head of Fermi surface with no change of the density of the liquid. Predictions and subsequent experimental observations of zero sound was one of the key confirmation on the correctness of Landau's Fermi liquid theory.

== Derivation from Boltzmann transport equation ==
The Boltzmann transport equation for general systems in the semiclassical limit gives, for a Fermi liquid,

$$\frac{\partial f}{\partial t}+\frac{\partial E}{\partial \vec{p}}\cdot\frac{\partial f}{\partial \vec{x}}-\frac{\partial E}{\partial \vec{x}}\cdot \frac{\partial f}{\partial \vec{p}} = \text{St}[f]$$,

where $f(\vec{p}, \vec{x}, t) = f_0(\vec{p}) + \delta f(\vec{p}, \vec{x}, t)$ is the density of quasiparticles (here we ignore spin) with momentum $\vec{p}$ and position $\vec{x}$ at time $t$, and $E(\vec{p},\vec{x}, t) = E_0(\vec{p}) + \delta E(\vec{p}, \vec{x}, t)$ is the energy of a quasiparticle of momentum $\vec{p}$ ($f_0$ and $E_0$ denote equilibrium distribution and energy in the equilibrium distribution). The semiclassical limit assumes that $f$ fluctuates with angular frequency $\omega$ and wavelength $\lambda = 2\pi/k$, which are much lower than $E_{\rm F}/\hbar$ and much longer than $\hbar/p_{\rm F}$ respectively, where $E_{\rm F}$ and $p_{\rm F}$ are the Fermi energy and momentum respectively, around which $f$ is nontrivial. To first order in fluctuation from equilibrium, the equation becomes

$$\frac{\partial \delta f}{\partial t}+\frac{\partial E_0}{\partial \vec{p}}\cdot\frac{\partial \delta f}{\partial \vec{x}}-\frac{\partial \delta E}{\partial \vec{x}}\cdot \frac{\partial f_0}{\partial \vec{p}} = \text{St}[f]$$.

When the quasiparticle's mean free path $\ell \ll \lambda$ (equivalently, relaxation time $\tau \ll 1/\omega$), ordinary sound waves ("first sound") propagate with little absorption. But at low temperatures $T$ (where $\tau$ and $\ell$ scale as $T^{-2}$ ), the mean free path exceeds $\lambda$, and as a result the collision functional $\text{St}[f] \approx 0$. Zero sound occurs in this collisionless limit.

In the Fermi liquid theory, the energy of a quasiparticle of momentum $\vec{p}$ is

$$E_{\rm F} + v_{\rm F}(|\vec{p}| -p_{\rm F}) + \int \frac{d^3 \vec{p}'}{4\pi p_{\rm F} m^{*}} F(p, p') \delta f( p')$$,

where $F$ is the appropriately normalized Landau parameter, and

$$f_0(\vec{p}) = \Theta(p_{\rm F} - |\vec{p}|)$$.

The approximated transport equation then has plane wave solutions

$$\delta f(\vec{p}, \vec{x}, t) = \delta(E(\vec{p})-E_{\rm F})e^{i(\vec{k}\cdot \vec{r}-\omega t)} \nu( \hat{p})$$,

with $\nu(\hat{p})$ given by

$$(\omega - v_{\rm F} \hat{p}\cdot \hat{k}) \nu(\hat{p}) = v_{\rm F} \hat{p} \cdot \hat{k} \int d^2 \frac{\hat{p}'}{4\pi} F(\hat{p}, \hat{p}') \nu(\hat{p}')$$.

This functional operator equation gives the dispersion relation for the zero sound waves with frequency $\omega$ and wave vector $\vec{k}$ . The transport equation is valid in the regime where $\hbar \omega \ll E_{\rm F}$ and $\hbar |\vec{k}| \ll p_{\rm F}$.

In many systems, $F(\hat{p},\hat{p}')$ only slowly depends on the angle between $\hat{p}$ and $\hat{p}'$. If $F$ is an angle-independent constant $F_0$ with $F_0>0$ (note that this constraint is stricter than the Pomeranchuk instability) then the wave has the form $\nu(\hat{p}) \propto ({\omega}/({v_{\rm F} \hat{p} \cdot \vec{k}}) -1)^{-1}$ and dispersion relation $\frac{s}{2} \log{\frac{s+1}{s-1}} - 1 = 1/F_0$ where $s = \omega/{k v_{\rm F}}$ is the ratio of zero sound phase velocity to Fermi velocity. If the first two Legendre components of the Landau parameter are significant, $F(\hat{p},\hat{p}') = F_0 + F_1 \hat{p}\cdot\hat{p}'$ and $F_1>6$, the system also admits an asymmetric zero sound wave solution $\nu(\hat{p}) \propto {\sin(2\theta)}/({s-\cos{\theta}})e^{i\phi}$ (where $\phi$ and $\theta$ are the azimuthal and polar angle of $\hat{p}$ about the propagation direction $\hat{k}$) and dispersion relation

$$\int_{0}^{\pi} \frac{\sin^3 \theta \cos \theta}{ s - \cos\theta} d\theta = \frac{4}{F_1}$$.

== See also ==
- Second sound
- Third sound
