= Microscopic theory =

A microscopic theory is one that contains a detailed explanation of a physical phenomenon at the atomic or subatomic level in contrast to a higher level or classical macroscopic or phenomenological theory. For example, in superconductivity, BCS theory is a microscopic theory because it explains how superconductivity arises from the collective interactions of electrons and phonons in a material, in contrast to Ginzburg-Landau theory which is phenomenological because it describes the dynamics of superconductivity without proposing a concrete physical explanation.
