= Superfluidity =

Fluid which flows without losing kinetic energy

Helium II will "creep" along surfaces in order to find its own level—after a short while, the levels in the two containers will equalize. The Rollin film also covers the interior of the larger container; if it were not sealed, the helium II would creep out and escape.

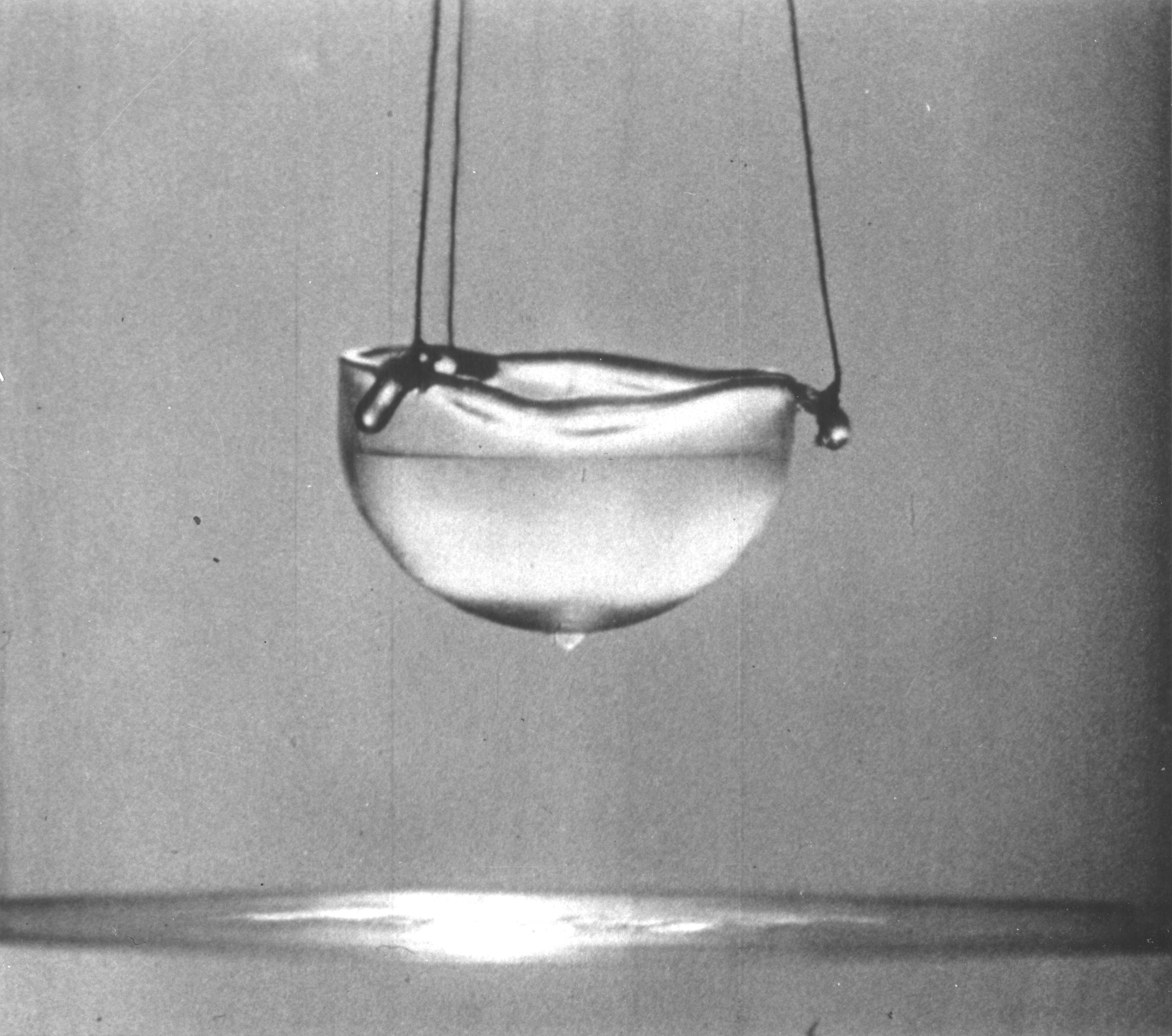
The liquid helium is in the superfluid phase. A thin invisible film creeps up the inside wall of the bowl and down on the outside. A drop forms. It will fall off into the liquid helium below. This will repeat until the cup is empty—provided the liquid remains superfluid.

Explanatory video on superfluidity

Superfluidity is the characteristic property of a fluid with zero viscosity which therefore flows without any loss of kinetic energy. When stirred, a superfluid forms vortices that continue to rotate indefinitely. Superfluidity occurs in two isotopes of helium (helium-3 and helium-4) when they are liquefied by cooling to cryogenic temperatures. It is also a property of various other exotic states of matter theorized to exist in astrophysics, high-energy physics, and theories of quantum gravity. The semi-phenomenological theory of superfluidity was developed by Soviet theoretical physicists Lev Landau and Isaak Khalatnikov.

Superfluidity often co-occurs with Bose–Einstein condensation (BEC), but neither phenomenon is directly related to the other; not all Bose–Einstein condensates can be regarded as superfluids, and not all superfluids are Bose–Einstein condensates. Even when superfluidity and condensation co-occur, their magnitudes are not linked: at low temperature, liquid helium has a large superfluid fraction but a low condensate fraction; while a weakly interacting BEC, with almost unity condensate fraction, can display a vanishing superfluid fraction.

Superfluids have some potential practical uses, such as dissolving substances in a quantum solvent.

== Superfluidity of liquid helium ==
Superfluidity was discovered in helium-4 by Pyotr Kapitsa and independently by John F. Allen and Don Misener in 1937. Onnes possibly observed the superfluid phase transition on August 2 1911, the same day that he observed superconductivity in mercury. It has since been described through phenomenology and microscopic theories. Only Kapitza received the Nobel Prize for this discovery. The accepted macroscopic theory of superfluidity in helium-4 was developed by Lev Landau in 1941. [L. D. Landau, J. Phys. USSR 5, 71 (1941), "The Theory Of Superfluidity In Helium II".] Landau received the Nobel Prize for this work in 1962.

In liquid helium-4, the superfluidity occurs at far higher temperatures than it does in helium-3. Each atom of helium-4 is a boson particle, by virtue of its integer spin. A helium-3 atom is a fermion particle; it can form bosons only by pairing with another particle like itself, which occurs at much lower temperatures. The discovery of superfluidity in helium-3 was the basis for the award of the 1996 Nobel Prize in Physics. This process is similar to the electron pairing in superconductivity.

== Cold atomic gases ==
Superfluidity in an ultracold fermionic gas was experimentally proven by Wolfgang Ketterle and his team who observed quantum vortices in lithium-6 at a temperature of 50 nK at MIT in April 2005. Such vortices had previously been observed in an ultracold bosonic gas using rubidium-87 in 2000, and more recently in two-dimensional gases. As early as 1999, Lene Hau created such a condensate using sodium atoms for the purpose of slowing light, and later stopping it completely. Her team subsequently used this system of compressed light to generate the superfluid analogue of shock waves and tornadoes:

These dramatic excitations result in the formation of solitons that in turn decay into quantized vortices—created far out of equilibrium, in pairs of opposite circulation—revealing directly the process of superfluid breakdown in Bose–Einstein condensates. With a double light-roadblock setup, we can generate controlled collisions between shock waves resulting in completely unexpected, nonlinear excitations. We have observed hybrid structures consisting of vortex rings embedded in dark solitonic shells. The vortex rings act as 'phantom propellers' leading to very rich excitation dynamics.

— Lene Hau, SIAM Conference on Nonlinear Waves and Coherent Structures

== Superfluids in astrophysics ==
The idea that superfluidity exists inside neutron stars was first proposed by Arkady Migdal. By analogy with electrons inside superconductors forming Cooper pairs because of electron–lattice interaction, it is expected that nucleons in a neutron star at sufficiently high density and low temperature can also form Cooper pairs because of the long-range attractive nuclear force and lead to superfluidity and superconductivity.

In the theory of superfluid dark matter, dark matter can exist in a superfluid state at certain scales that then mediates a MOND like force through phonons in the superfluid, this theory intends to replicate the partial successes of dark matter and modified gravity - at smaller scales the theory produces MOND like dynamics and then allows for a replication of the successes of MOND for example in predicting galaxy rotation curves and a tight Tully-Fisher relation, and avoids problems caused by ordinary cold dark matter theory where dense dark matter halos produce too much dynamical friction. At larger scales the theory produces behavior similar to warm or hot dark matter which allows for additional mass at the galaxy cluster scale, where MOND under-predicts the strength of gravity, and allows for replication of phenomena that can be well described by dark matter such as the cosmic microwave background.

== In high-energy physics and quantum gravity ==
Superfluid vacuum theory (SVT) is an approach in theoretical physics and quantum mechanics where the physical vacuum is viewed as superfluid.

The ultimate goal of the approach is to develop scientific models that unify quantum mechanics (describing three of the four known fundamental interactions) with gravity. This makes SVT a candidate for the theory of quantum gravity and an extension of the Standard Model.

It is hoped that development of such a theory would unify into a single consistent model of all fundamental interactions, and to describe all known interactions and elementary particles as different manifestations of the same entity, superfluid vacuum.

On the macro-scale a larger similar phenomenon has been suggested as happening in the murmurations of starlings. The rapidity of change in flight patterns mimics the phase change leading to superfluidity in some liquid states.

== See also ==
- Boojum (superfluidity)
- Condensed matter physics
- Fluid dynamics
- Macroscopic quantum phenomena
- Quantum hydrodynamics
- Slow light
- Supersolid
- Two-fluid model
