= BCS theory =

Microscopic theory of superconductivity

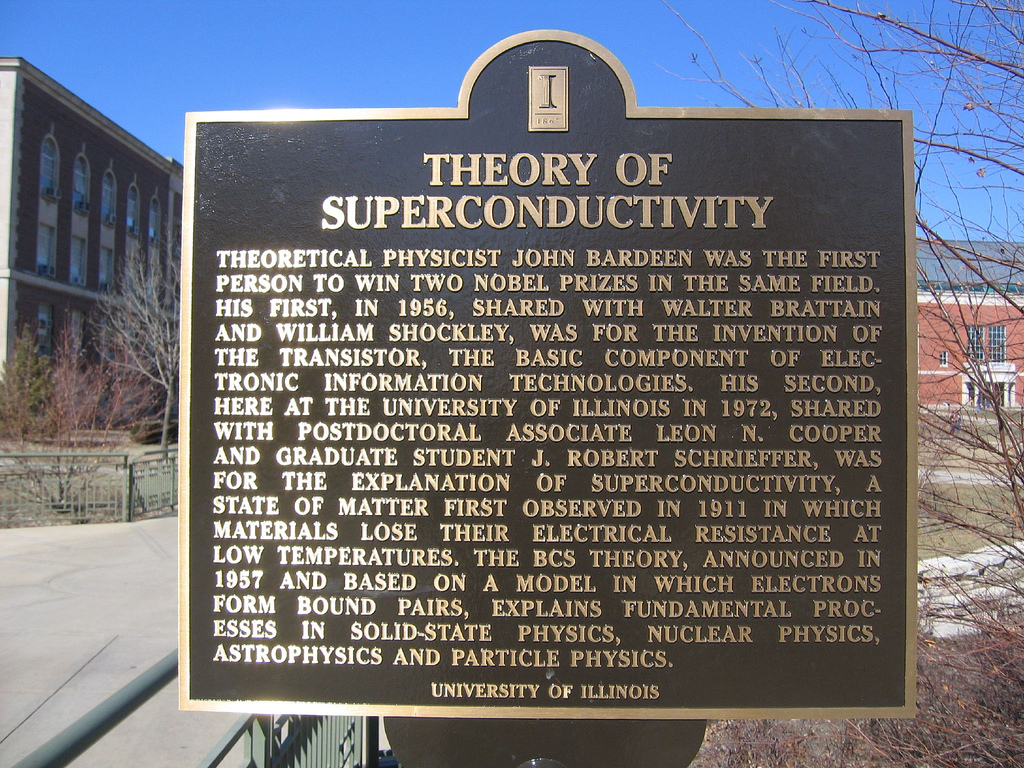
A commemorative plaque placed in the Bardeen Engineering Quad at the University of Illinois at Urbana-Champaign. It commemorates the Theory of Superconductivity developed here by John Bardeen and his students, for which they won a Nobel Prize for Physics in 1972.

In physics, the Bardeen–Cooper–Schrieffer (BCS) theory is a microscopic theory of superconductivity which explains many thermodynamic and electromagnetic properties of superconductors. The theory describes superconductivity as a microscopic effect caused by a condensation of pairs of electrons known as Cooper pairs. These pairs move through the lattice without resistance.

The theory is named after John Bardeen, Leon Cooper, and John Robert Schrieffer who proposed it in 1957 while at the University of Illinois. They received the Nobel Prize in Physics for this theory in 1972.

The theory predicts many properties of superconductors such as the energy gap, the isotope effect, and the Meissner effect. Many superconductors can be described entirely by BCS theory and its extensions; these are called conventional superconductors. Unconventional superconductors, on the other hand, cannot be described by BCS theory in entirety. Unconventional superconductors and their relationship with BCS theory is an open research question in condensed matter physics. The theory is also used in nuclear physics to describe the pairing interaction between nucleons in an atomic nucleus.

== History ==
Superconductivity was first experimentally observed in 1911 by Heike Kamerlingh Onnes, for which he won the 1913 Nobel Prize. From the time of the discovery to the 1950s, many scientists tried to conceive of a theory for superconductivity, but initial progress was slow, as a quantum theory for metals had not been developed.

Rapid progress in understanding superconductivity gained momentum in the 1950s. It began with the 1948 paper, "On the Problem of the Molecular Theory of Superconductivity", where Fritz London proposed that the phenomenological London equations may be consequences of the coherence of a quantum state.

In 1950, Lev Landau and Vitaly Ginzburg proposed a phenomenological theory of superconductors known as Ginzburg-Landau theory, which proposed that the electrons in a superconductor acted as a charged superfluid. In 1953, Brian Pippard, motivated by penetration experiments, proposed a new scale parameter modifying the London equations called the coherence length. John Bardeen then argued in the 1955 paper, "Theory of the Meissner Effect in Superconductors", that such a modification naturally occurs in a theory with an energy gap. Leon Cooper calculated of the bound states of electrons subject to an attractive force in his 1956 paper, "Bound Electron Pairs in a Degenerate Fermi Gas".

At this time, then-graduate student Robert Schrieffer began working on superconductivity at the University of Illinois along with John Bardeen as his thesis advisor, and Leon Cooper as a postdoctoral fellow.

In January of 1957, while attending a many-body theory meeting at the Stevens Institute of Technology, Schrieffer thought of the idea of using a statistical approach analogous to a mean field, because of the strong overlap of electron pairs in the superconductor. This was a breakthrough as it allowed Schrieffer to guess an appropriate ground-state wavefunction, now known as the BCS wavefunction. This allowed Bardeen, Cooper and Schrieffer to synthesize their ideas into a microscopic theory. Their theory was published in April as a letter titled "Microscopic Theory of Superconductivity".

The results were later published as a December 1957 paper titled "Theory of Superconductivity", which included the initial results of the letter, as well as derivations of the phase transition is second order, the Meissner effect and the calculations of specific heats and penetration depths. The trio received the Nobel Prize in Physics in 1972 for their theory.

In 1986, high-temperature superconductivity was discovered in La-Ba-Cu-O, at temperatures up to 30 K. Following experiments determined more materials with transition temperatures up to about 130 K, considerably above the previous limit of about 30 K. It is experimentally very well known that the transition temperature strongly depends on pressure. In general, it is believed that BCS theory alone cannot explain this phenomenon and that other effects are in play. These effects are still not yet fully understood; it is possible that they even control superconductivity at low temperatures for some materials.

== Overview ==
At sufficiently low temperatures, electrons near the Fermi surface become unstable against the formation of Cooper pairs. Cooper showed such binding will occur in the presence of an attractive potential, no matter how weak. In conventional superconductors, an attraction is generally attributed to an electron-lattice interaction. The BCS theory, however, requires only that the potential be attractive, regardless of its origin. In the BCS framework, superconductivity is a macroscopic effect which results from the condensation of Cooper pairs. These have some bosonic properties, and bosons, at sufficiently low temperature, can form a large Bose–Einstein condensate. Superconductivity was simultaneously explained by Nikolay Bogolyubov, by means of the Bogoliubov transformations.

In many superconductors, the attractive interaction between electrons (necessary for pairing) is brought about indirectly by the Bardeen–Pines interaction between the electrons and the vibrating crystal lattice (the phonons). Roughly speaking the picture is the following:

An electron moving through a conductor will attract nearby positive charges in the lattice. This deformation of the lattice causes another electron, with opposite spin, to move into the region of higher positive charge density. The two electrons then become correlated. Because there are a lot of such electron pairs in a superconductor, these pairs overlap very strongly and form a highly collective condensate. In this "condensed" state, the breaking of one pair will change the energy of the entire condensate - not just a single electron, or a single pair. Thus, the energy required to break any single pair is related to the energy required to break all of the pairs (or more than just two electrons). Because the pairing increases this energy barrier, kicks from oscillating atoms in the conductor (which are small at sufficiently low temperatures) are not enough to affect the condensate as a whole, or any individual "member pair" within the condensate. Thus the electrons stay paired together and resist all kicks, and the electron flow as a whole (the current through the superconductor) will not experience resistance. Thus, the collective behavior of the condensate is a crucial ingredient necessary for superconductivity.

=== Details ===
BCS theory starts from the assumption that there is some attraction between electrons, which can overcome the Coulomb repulsion. In most materials (in low temperature superconductors), this attraction is brought about indirectly by the coupling of electrons to the crystal lattice (as explained above). However, the results of BCS theory do not depend on the origin of the attractive interaction. For instance, Cooper pairs have been observed in ultracold gases of fermions where a homogeneous magnetic field has been tuned to their Feshbach resonance. The original results of BCS (discussed below) described an s-wave superconducting state, which is the rule among low-temperature superconductors but is not realized in many unconventional superconductors such as the d-wave high-temperature superconductors.

Extensions of BCS theory exist to describe these other cases, although they are insufficient to completely describe the observed features of high-temperature superconductivity.

BCS is able to give an approximation for the quantum-mechanical many-body state of the system of (attractively interacting) electrons inside the metal. This state is now known as the BCS state. In the normal state of a metal, electrons move independently, whereas in the BCS state, they are bound into Cooper pairs by the attractive interaction. The BCS formalism is based on the reduced potential for the electrons' attraction. Within this potential, a variational ansatz for the wave function is proposed. This ansatz was later shown to be exact in the dense limit of pairs. Note that the continuous crossover between the dilute and dense regimes of attracting pairs of fermions is still an open problem, which now attracts a lot of attention within the field of ultracold gases.

=== Underlying evidence ===
The hyperphysics website pages at Georgia State University summarize some key background to BCS theory as follows:

Evidence of a band gap at the Fermi level (described as "a key piece in the puzzle")
the existence of a critical temperature and critical magnetic field implied a band gap, and suggested a phase transition, but single electrons are forbidden from condensing to the same energy level by the Pauli exclusion principle. The site comments that "a drastic change in conductivity demanded a drastic change in electron behavior". Conceivably, pairs of electrons might perhaps act like bosons instead, which are bound by different condensate rules and do not have the same limitation.
Isotope effect on the critical temperature, suggesting lattice interactions
The Debye frequency of phonons in a lattice is proportional to the inverse of the square root of the mass of lattice ions. It was shown that the superconducting transition temperature of mercury indeed showed the same dependence, by substituting the most abundant natural mercury isotope, ^{202}Hg, with a different isotope, ^{198}Hg.
An exponential rise in heat capacity near the critical temperature for some superconductors
An exponential increase in heat capacity near the critical temperature also suggests an energy bandgap for the superconducting material. As superconducting vanadium is warmed toward its critical temperature, its heat capacity increases greatly in a very few degrees; this suggests an energy gap being bridged by thermal energy.
The lessening of the measured energy gap towards the critical temperature
This suggests a type of situation where some kind of binding energy exists but it is gradually weakened as the temperature increases toward the critical temperature. A binding energy suggests two or more particles or other entities that are bound together in the superconducting state. This helped to support the idea of bound particles – specifically electron pairs – and together with the above helped to paint a general picture of paired electrons and their lattice interactions.

== Implications ==
BCS derived several important theoretical predictions that are independent of the details of the interaction, since the quantitative predictions mentioned below hold for any sufficiently weak attraction between the electrons and this last condition is fulfilled for many low temperature superconductors - the so-called weak-coupling case. These have been confirmed in numerous experiments:

- The electrons are bound into Cooper pairs, and these pairs are correlated due to the Pauli exclusion principle for the electrons, from which they are constructed. Therefore, in order to break a pair, one has to change energies of all other pairs. This means there is an energy gap for single-particle excitation, unlike in the normal metal (where the state of an electron can be changed by adding an arbitrarily small amount of energy). This energy gap is highest at low temperatures but vanishes at the transition temperature when superconductivity ceases to exist. The BCS theory gives an expression that shows how the gap grows with the strength of the attractive interaction and the (normal phase) single particle density of states at the Fermi level. Furthermore, it describes how the density of states is changed on entering the superconducting state, where there are no electronic states any more at the Fermi level. The energy gap is most directly observed in tunneling experiments and in reflection of microwaves from superconductors.
- BCS theory predicts the dependence of the value of the energy gap Δ at temperature T on the critical temperature T_{c}. The ratio between the value of the energy gap at zero temperature and the value of the superconducting transition temperature (expressed in energy units) takes the universal value
  $$\Delta(T=0) = 1.764 \, k_{\rm B}T_{\rm c},$$
  independent of material. Near the critical temperature the relation asymptotes to
  $$\Delta(T \to T_{\rm c})\approx 3.06 \, k_{\rm B}T_{\rm c}\sqrt{1-(T/T_{\rm c})}$$
  which is of the form suggested the previous year by M. J. Buckingham based on the fact that the superconducting phase transition is second order, that the superconducting phase has a mass gap and on Blevins, Gordy and Fairbank's experimental results the previous year on the absorption of millimeter waves by superconducting tin.
- Due to the energy gap, the specific heat of the superconductor is suppressed strongly (exponentially) at low temperatures, there being no thermal excitations left. However, before reaching the transition temperature, the specific heat of the superconductor becomes even higher than that of the normal conductor (measured immediately above the transition) and the ratio of these two values is found to be universally given by 2.5.
- BCS theory correctly predicts the Meissner effect, i.e. the expulsion of a magnetic field from the superconductor and the variation of the penetration depth (the extent of the screening currents flowing below the metal's surface) with temperature.
- It also describes the variation of the critical magnetic field (above which the superconductor can no longer expel the field but becomes normal conducting) with temperature. BCS theory relates the value of the critical field at zero temperature to the value of the transition temperature and the density of states at the Fermi level.
- In its simplest form, BCS gives the superconducting transition temperature T_{c} in terms of the electron-phonon coupling potential V and the Debye cutoff energy E_{D}:
  $$k_{\rm B}\,T_{\rm c} = 1.134E_{\rm D}\,{e^{-1/N(0)\,V}},$$
  where N(0) is the electronic density of states at the Fermi level. For more details, see Cooper pairs.
- The BCS theory reproduces the isotope effect, which is the experimental observation that for a given superconducting material, the critical temperature is inversely proportional to the square-root of the mass of the isotope used in the material. The isotope effect was reported by two groups on 24 March 1950, who discovered it independently working with different mercury isotopes, although a few days before publication they learned of each other's results at the ONR conference in Atlanta. The two groups are Emanuel Maxwell, and C. A. Reynolds, B. Serin, W. H. Wright, and L. B. Nesbitt. The choice of isotope ordinarily has little effect on the electrical properties of a material, but does affect the frequency of lattice vibrations. This effect suggests that superconductivity is related to vibrations of the lattice. This is incorporated into BCS theory, where lattice vibrations yield the binding energy of electrons in a Cooper pair.
- Little–Parks experiment - One of the first indications to the importance of the Cooper-pairing principle.

== See also ==
- Magnesium diboride, considered a BCS superconductor
- Quasiparticle
- Little–Parks effect, one of the first indications of the importance of the Cooper pairing principle.
