= Cooper pair =

Pair of electrons bound together at low temperature, allowing for superconductivity

In condensed matter physics, a Cooper pair or Bardeen–Cooper–Schrieffer (BCS) pair is a pair of electrons (or other fermions) bound together at low temperatures in a certain manner first described in 1956 by American physicist Leon Cooper. The Cooper pairing of electrons in certain materials at low temperatures is responsible for the phenomenon of superconductivity.

== Description ==
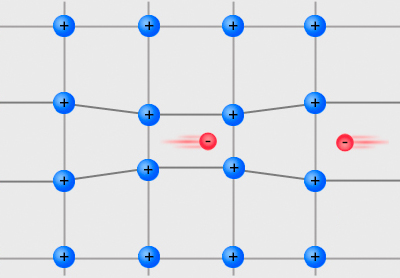
Schematic illustration of the Cooper pairing interaction in BCS superconductors

Cooper showed that an arbitrarily small attraction between electrons in a metal can cause a paired state of electrons to have a lower energy than the Fermi energy, which implies that the pair is bound. In conventional superconductors, this attraction is due to Bardeen–Pines interaction, a type of electron–phonon interaction. The Cooper pair state is responsible for superconductivity, as described in the BCS theory developed by John Bardeen, Leon Cooper, and John Schrieffer for which they shared the 1972 Nobel Prize in Physics.

Although Cooper pairing is a quantum effect, the reason for the pairing can be seen from a simplified classical explanation. An electron in a metal normally behaves as a free particle. The electron is repelled from other electrons due to their negative charge, but it also attracts the positive ions that make up the rigid lattice of the metal. This attraction distorts the ion lattice, moving the ions slightly toward the electron, increasing the positive charge density of the lattice in the vicinity. This positive charge can attract other electrons. At long distances, this attraction between electrons due to the displaced ions can overcome the electrons' repulsion due to their negative charge, and cause them to pair up. The rigorous quantum mechanical explanation shows that the effect is due to electron–phonon interactions, with the phonon being the collective motion of the positively-charged lattice.

The energy of the pairing interaction is quite weak, of the order of 10^{−3} eV, and thermal energy can easily break the pairs. So only at low temperatures, in metal and other substrates, are a significant number of the electrons bound in Cooper pairs.

The electrons in a pair are not necessarily close together; because the interaction is long range, paired electrons may still be many hundreds of nanometers apart. This distance is usually greater than the average interelectron distance so that many Cooper pairs can occupy the same space. Electrons have spin-1/2, so they are fermions, but the total spin of a Cooper pair is integer (0 or 1) so it is a composite boson. This means the wave functions are symmetric under particle interchange. Therefore, unlike electrons, multiple Cooper pairs are allowed to be in the same quantum state, which is responsible for the phenomenon of superconductivity.

Illustration of fermionic pairings changing from a BCS superfluid with weak coupling to those of a system of diatomic molecules

The BCS theory is also applicable to other fermion systems, such as helium-3. Indeed, Cooper pairing is responsible for the superfluidity of helium-3 at low temperatures. In 2008 it was proposed that pairs of bosons in an optical lattice may be similar to Cooper pairs.

== Relationship to superconductivity ==
The tendency for all the Cooper pairs in a body to "condense" into the same ground quantum state is responsible for the peculiar properties of superconductivity.

Cooper originally considered only the case of an isolated pair's formation in a metal. When one considers the more realistic state of many electronic pair formations, as is elucidated in the full BCS theory, one finds that the pairing opens a gap in the continuous spectrum of allowed energy states of the electrons, meaning that all excitations of the system must possess some minimum amount of energy. This gap to excitations leads to superconductivity, since small excitations such as scattering of electrons are forbidden. The gap appears due to many-body effects between electrons feeling the attraction.

R. A. Ogg Jr., was first to suggest in 1946 that electrons might act as pairs coupled by lattice vibrations in the material. This was indicated by the isotope effect observed in superconductors. The isotope effect showed that materials with heavier ions (different nuclear isotopes) had lower superconducting transition temperatures. This can be explained by the theory of Cooper pairing: heavier ions are harder for the electrons to attract and move (how Cooper pairs are formed), which results in smaller binding energy for the pairs.

The theory of Cooper pairs is quite general and does not depend on the specific electron-phonon interaction. Condensed matter theorists have proposed pairing mechanisms based on other attractive interactions such as electron–exciton interactions or electron–plasmon interactions. Currently, none of these other pairing interactions has been observed in any material.

Although the term Cooper pairs is commonly used, it is more accurate to speak of Cooper pairing, as superconductivity does not arise from individual electrons binding into localized "quasi-bosons" that would follow Bose–Einstein statistics. Rather, by forming a coherent many-body ground state, electrons make optimal use of the available phase space under the Pauli exclusion principle.

== See also ==
- BCS theory
- Josephson effect
- Color–flavor locking
- Superinsulator
- Topological superconductor
- Unconventional superconductor
- Lone pair
- Electron pair
