= Emilie Jäger =

Austrian-Swiss geologist

Emilie Jäger (January 4, 1926 - July 27, 2011) was an Austrian-Swiss geologist who specialized in Isotope geochemistry. She was a professor at the University of Bern.

== Career and research ==
Jäger studied chemistry at the University of Vienna. She moved to the University of Bern in 1952 where she developed on interest in mineralogy, chemistry, and the isotope chemistry of minerals. During her doctoral studies, she studied under Heinrich Huttenlocher in the Department of Mineralogy and then under Fritz Houtermans in the Department of Physics. With new isotopic methods developed and an increased industry interest in dating minerals, Jäger's supervisors sent her to work in the Carnegie Institute in Washington DC. There she learned the new techniques Rubidium–strontium dating of minerals and worked with geochemists such as George Tilton and Henry Faul. In 1959, she published a paper with Henry Faul showing that it was possible to successfully date Alpine biotites spanning an age range of 17 - 290 Ma using the Rubidium–strontium and Potassium–argon dating methods.

Jäger set up an isotopic mineralogy laboratory at the University of Bern and carried out the first Rubidium–strontium dating on minerals in 1959. After experimenting with mineral Rubidium–strontium isotope compositions in the Alpine orogen, she hypothesized that mineral ages had to be determined using cooling ages. In 1962, Jäger summarized her theory in a paper titled "Rb–Sr Age Determinations on Micas and Total Rocks from the Alps." Later in her career, she became involved other aspects of isotope geochemistry, including mineral standards for radioisotopic dating, decay constants, and the establishment of environmental isotope chemistry.

Jäger was awarded the Leopold-von-Buch-Plakette in 1980. She was elected as a member as German National Academy of Sciences Leopoldina in 1988.

== Works ==
In 1979, she published the book "Lectures in Isotope Geology" with Johannes C. Hunziker. The book consisted of two parts, lectures and excursions.
