= UPTI Affair =

Repressions of physicists in the Soviet Union

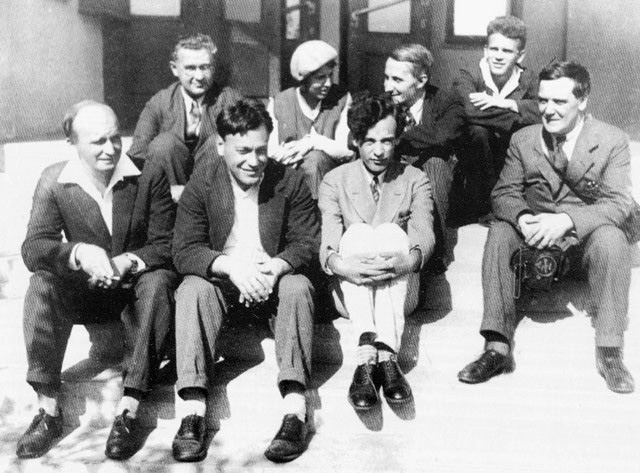
Some UPTI members during the visit of Lev Landau (second from right, front). The leftmost is Lev Shubnikov, executed

UPTI Affair (Ukrainian: Справа УФТІ, Sprava UFTI; Russian: Дело УФТИ, Delo UFTI) was a series of repressions against a number of scholars of the Ukrainian Physics and Technology Institute in Kharkov, Soviet Ukraine, by the Main Directorate of State Security (GUGB) during 1938, as part of the Great Purge.

As a result, the UFTI leaders, including a Soviet experimental physicist Lev Shubnikov, were arrested and executed during this crisis. In the response to the state of affairs, the Soviet physicists Moisey Korets and Lev Landau, wrote the Korets–Landau leaflet which directly condemned Joseph Stalin and the secret police NKVD. Korets and Landau, as well as another implicated scientist, Yuri Rumer, were arrested. Landau was released, but Korets and Rumer were imprisoned in sharashkas of gulag.

== History ==
A total of 16 UPTI employees suffered from the repressions. Moisei Korets was the first to be arrested on 28 November 1935, but he was soon released and reinstated at UPTI.

On 26 May 1936, Eva Zeisel (by then ex-wife of Alexander Weissberg and artistic director of the USSR's porcelain and glass industry) was arrested in Moscow. She was accused of plotting an assassination attempt on Joseph Stalin and sent first to the internal prison at Lubyanka, then to Kresty Prison in Leningrad. Alexander Weisberg traveled to Leningrad and then to Moscow to intercede on her behalf. His campaign lasted several months and was ultimately successful: in September 1937, Eva was unexpectedly released, issued a new passport, and expelled from the country. She traveled through Poland to Austria.

In February 1937, Korets followed Lev Landau to Moscow. In the same year, after Landau's departure for Moscow, five leading UPTI employees were arrested and executed: Lev Shubnikov, Lev Rozenkevich, Vadim Gorsky, Valentin Fomin, and Konrad Weiselberg; in addition, two German nationals were arrested and subsequently handed over to the Gestapo: Fritz Houtermans (member of the German Communist Party) and the aforementioned Weissberg-Cybulski (member of the Communist Party of Austria). Fritz Lange was the only foreign scientist who was neither arrested nor deported. Lange was among the first group of German anti-fascists to arrive in the USSR, and his new Soviet documents were personally signed by Stalin. These documents probably saved Lange from repression.

Still in 1937, the institute's party organiszer and head of construction of the Deep Cooling Experimental Station, Pyotr Komarov, who had replaced Weisberg-Cybulski in this position, and the head of the supply department, Konstantin Nikolaeyvsky, were executed. In addition, graduate students Ivan Gusak and Pyotr Komarov, both working at the station, were also arrested. Gusak was released and continued working at UPTI but died on the Eastern Front of World War II. Komarov died in prison. The same year, as part of the UPTI affair, Isaak Pomeranchuk was expelled from the Komsomol “for connections with Landau.”

In February 1938, Georgy Demidov was arrested, tried by a military tribunal, and sentenced to five years in Kolyma under Article 58-10 (anti-Soviet and counter-revolutionary propaganda and agitation). In 1951, he was transferred from Kolyma (by the 4th Special Department of the NKVD) to work on an atomic project as an experimental physicist. However, since his sentence was set to expire in a few months due to his credits, he was sent to Inta, Komi ASSR, as an administrative exile. He then moved to Ukhta, where, from 1954 he worked at the Ukhta Mechanical Plant.

On 26 April 1938, Moscow State University professor Yuri Rumer was arrested on Arbat Street in Moscow “as an accomplice to Landau, an enemy of the people,” while heading out with friends to celebrate his birthday. In 1953, after completing his exile, he was hired as a senior researcher at the West Siberian Branch of the Academy of Sciences of the Soviet Union. Rumer, Landau, and Korets were arrested. Korets was arrested on 27 April 1938 and amnestied on 18 March 1952, after serving 14 years at a correctional labour camp. However, he remained exiled until 1958, working at the Intaugol plant.

Landau was arrested on 28 April 1938. The charges against him related to his work at UPTI. He spent exactly one year in prison and was released on 28 April 1939, thanks to the petition of eminent physicists Niels Bohr and Pyotr Kapitsa.

On 4 June 1938, the second director of the UPTI, Aleksandr Leipunskii, was arrested, but was released on 7 August of the same year. On 22 June 1938, the first director of the UPTI, Ivan Obreimov, was arrested. On 19 November 1940, he was sentenced to eight years in a forced labor camp and sent to Kotlas. Sergey Vavilov, Abram Ioffe, Vladimir Komarov, and others spoke in his defense. On 21 May 1941, he was released due to lack of evidence of a crime and reinstated at UPTI. Martin Ruhemann was able to emigrate: he applied for exit visas for him and his wife, Barbara Ruhemann, and they were able to move to England in Spring 1938. He obtained a position at the Imperial College.

UPTI ceased to exist as a center of theoretical and experimental physics on a European scale, and Houtermans ended up in Nazi Germany, involved there in the German nuclear program.

In 1951, Houtermans published the book Russian Purge and the Extraction of Confession in London, written with his cellmate from Kiev's Lukyanivska Prison, Konstantin Shteppa; the book was published under pseudonyms.
