= Oleg Lavrentiev =

Soviet physicist

- Олег Лаврентьев
- Born: July 26, 1926; Pskov, Russian SFSR, Soviet Union
- Died: February 10, 2011 (aged 84); Kharkiv, Ukraine
- Citizenship: Soviet Union Ukraine
- Education: Kharkiv Institute of Physics and Technology
- Scientific career
- Fields: Physics

Oleg Alexandrovich Lavrentiev (Ukrainian: Лаврентьєв Олег Олександрович; July 7, 1926 – February 10, 2011) was a physicist who worked on the Soviet atomic bomb project and whose research contributions were fundamental to the understanding of thermonuclear fusion.

He was a self-taught physicist who was allowed to attend the Moscow State University but did not secure graduation from. Eventually, the Kharkiv Institute of Physics and Technology awarded him the doctorate in 2004.

== Early life ==
Lavrentiev was born in Pskov, into a family descended from peasants. His father, Alexander, completed 2 years at a parochial school, worked as a clerk at the Vydvizhenets factory in Pskov, his mother, Alexandra, completed 4 years and worked as a nurse. The family lived on Pogankin Lane. The future scientist attended the Second Model School.

During the war, at age 18 he volunteered for the front as a reconnaissance observer. He participated in the battles for the Baltic States (1944–1945), for which he received military awards.

After the war ended, he transferred to the Sakhalin Military District, and continued military service in Poronaisk. There, he was fortunate to have found his commanders, Major Shcherbakov, the deputy commander for political affairs, and Lieutenant Colonel Plotnikov. They helped Oleg retrain from reconnaissance to radio operations and take up the rank of sergeant. In addition, the garrison had a library with a fairly large selection of technical literature and textbooks.

== The hydrogen bomb and controlled fusion ==
While in grade 7 (in 1941) upon reading "Introduction to Nuclear Physics", he showed interest in this topic. While in the military on Sakhalin, Lavrentiev educated himself, using the library of technical literature and college textbooks. With his military allowance he was able to order books from Moscow and subscribed to the scientific journal of the USSR Academy of Sciences, Uspekhi Fizicheskikh Nauk (Advances in Physical Science), which was intended for researchers, graduate students, and physics teachers.

In 1948, Lavrentiev was instructed to prepare a lecture on nuclear physics. With a few days to prepare, he had time to rethink the problem and wrote a letter to the Central Committee of the CPSU (b). From Moscow came an order to create for him an environment where he could work. In a guarded room dedicated to him, he wrote his first article, which he sent in July 1950 via secret mail to the department of heavy equipment engineering of the Central Committee.

His proposal consisted of two parts. Firstly, he proposed an implementation of a hydrogen bomb, based on lithium deuteride. In the second part of his work, he describes how to obtain electricity from a controlled thermonuclear reaction. Andrei Sakharov reviewed his work and wrote in a review the following:

... I think we need a detailed discussion of comrade Lavrentiev's draft proposal. Regardless of the outcome of the discussion now is the time to note the creative initiative of the author. "

In 1950 Lavrentiev was demobilized from the army and came to Moscow, where he entered the Physics Department of Moscow State University. A few months later he was summoned to the minister of the measuring instrument (the nuclear industry) V.A. Makhnev, and a few days later - to the Kremlin to the chairman of an ad hoc committee on atomic and hydrogen weapons, Lavrentiy Beria.

After meeting with Beria, Lavrentiev was given a room in the new house and a scholarship. He was allowed to attend lectures at will and to request on-demand delivery of scientific literature. He was assigned a math supervising professor PhD A.A. Samarskii (later - academician and Hero of Socialist Labor).

In May 1951, Lavrentiev got access to newly opened State program of fusion research. (Laboratory of instrumentation of the USSR, currently - Kurchatov Institute), where research was carried out on high temperature plasma physics classified as top-secret. There was already ongoing testing and development of Andrei Sakharov's and Igor Tamm's ideas for the fusion reactor.

On August 12, 1953 the Soviet Union tested a thermonuclear warhead based on lithium deuteride. Unlike other participants in the development of new weapons that have received state awards and ranks, Lavrentiev was denied admission to the lab, and was forced to write a thesis project without access to the lab and without a scientific adviser. Nonetheless, he graduated with honors based on his theoretical work on controlled thermonuclear fusion.

In the spring of 1956, Lavrentiev was sent to Kharkiv Theoretical Physics School (KIPT, Kharkov, USSR), and presented his report on the theory of electromagnetic traps to the institute director Cyril Sinelnikov. In 1958, KIPT built the first electromagnetic trap.

== Legacy ==
In July 2010, Oleg Lavrentyev was awarded the title of "Honorary Citizen of the City of Pskov".

He died on February 10, 2011, in Kharkiv at the age of 84, and was buried in the cemetery in the village of Lesnoye next to his wife. His obituary noted his modesty and scientific achievements.

On July 22, 2011, a memorial plaque to Oleg Lavrentyev, an "Honorary Citizen of Pskov" and nuclear physicist, was unveiled on building No. 3 of Muzeyny Lane in Pskov.

== Restoring primacy ==
In August 2001, the journal "Uspekhi Fizicheskikh Nauk" (Advances in physics science) published Lavrentiev's biography and his proposal mailed from Sakhalin on July 29, 1950 and the review by Sakharov, and Beria's orders. All of which were kept in the Archives of the Russian Federation President and designated as secret. This reestablishes the primacy of his scientific achievement.
