= Lev Shubnikov =

Soviet experimental physicist (1901–1937)

- Лев Васи́льевич Шу́бников
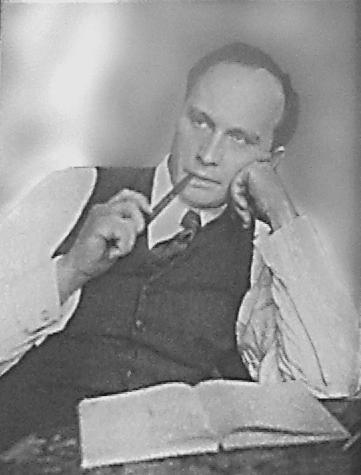
- Born: Lev Vasilyevich Shubnikov; September 29, 1901; Saint Petersburg, Russian Empire
- Died: November 10, 1937 (aged 36)
- Education: Leningrad Polytechnical Institute
- Known for: Shubnikov–de Haas effect Type II superconductors Antiferromagnetism
- Scientific career
- Fields: Experimental physics Cryogenics
- Workplaces: Ukrainian Physics and Technology Institute
- Doctoral advisor: Ivan Obreimov

Lev Vasilyevich Shubnikov (Russian: Лев Васи́льевич Шу́бников, Ukrainian: Лев Васильович Шубников; 29 September 1901 – 10 November 1937) was a Soviet experimental physicist who worked in the Netherlands and USSR. He has been referred as 'the founding father of Soviet low-temperature physics'. He is known for the discovery of the Shubnikov–de Haas effect and type-II superconductivity. He also one of the first to discover antiferromagnetism.

In 1937, he was executed during the Ukrainian Physics and Technology Institute Affair on the basis of falsified charges as part of the Great Purge.

== Life ==
=== Early life ===
Shubnikov was born into the family of a Saint Petersburg accountant.

After graduating from a gymnasium he entered Leningrad University. This was the first year of the Russian Civil War and he was the only student of that year attending the physics department. While yachting in the Gulf of Finland in 1921, he accidentally sailed from Saint Petersburg to Finland, was sent to Germany and could not return to Russia until 1922.

He then continued his education in the Leningrad Polytechnical Institute (LPTI), graduating in 1926. During his university training he worked with Ivan Obreimov, developing a new method (sometimes dubbed the Obreimov–Shubnikov method) for growing monocrystals from molten metals.

In 1925, he married the physicist Olga Nikolaevna Trapeznikova, who had also attended classes with Shubnikov at LPTI, and that knew each other from childhood.

=== Career ===
In 1926, at the recommendation of Abram Ioffe, he was sent to the Leiden cryogenic laboratory of Wander Johannes de Haas in the Netherlands; he worked there until 1930. Shubnikov studied bismuth crystals with low impurity concentrations, and in cooperation with de Haas he discovered magnetoresistance oscillations at low temperatures in magnetic fields, a phenomenon now known as the Shubnikov–de Haas effect. He was later rejoined by Trapeznikova who was also invited to do research in De Haas laboratory.

In 1930, Shubnikov returned to Kharkiv to work at the National Scientific Center Ukraine Institute of Physics and Technology (UPTI) led by his advisor. Obreimov wanted to establish the first Soviet cryogenic laboratory and appointed Shubnikov as its director in 1931. Schubnikov and his team studied the electric properties of metals and superconductors at low temperature, in the presence of magnetic fields. This research led J. N. Rjabinin and Shubnikov to discovery of type-II superconductivity in 1935 in single crystal lead-thallium (PbTl) and in lead-indium (Pb-In) alloys in 1937. The notation H_{c1} and H_{c2} to refer to the two critical magnetic fields in a type-II superconductor was first used by Shubnikov.

From 1932 to 1936, antiferromagnetism, a new magnetic phase of matter, was independently discovered by Louis Néel in France working under Pierre Weiss, and by Shubnikov, Trapeznikova and Lev Landau in the Soviet Union.

Together with Boris G. Lazarev Lev Shubnikov also discovered paramagnetism of solid state hydrogen in 1936. Lev Shubnikov was one of the first to study liquid helium.

=== Arrest and death ===
During the Stalin epoch, at the height of the Great Purge in 1937, the NKVD launched the UPTI Affair on the basis of allegations of antistate activities, and Shubnikov was arrested on 6 August 1937. Three months later he was sentenced to "10 years of prison without correspondence", on October 28. Other Soviet scientists working in Kharkiv were arrested in the following months including Obreimov. A year later, Moisey Korets and Landau planned to distribute some leaflets in protest but they were also arrested.

His wife Trapeznikova, tried to appeal, without any success. In 1957, she received a message that Shubnikov had died on November 8, 1945, of heart failure. A later source, reported in 1991 that Shubnikov was executed by firing squad on 10 November 1937, after a couple days of solitary confinement. Until 1991 his true date of death was not officially acknowledged; the Great Soviet Encyclopedia gave the year as 1945.

He was posthumously rehabilitated by the Supreme Court of the Soviet Union on 11 June 1957. Between 1937 and 1957, Soviet scientists were not allowed to cite Shubnikov's work.

== Later recognition ==
Before World War II, Martin Ruhemann who worked in Kharkiv, promoted the papers of Shubnikov in Europe. Pyotr Kapitsa who was working in the University of Cambridge, visited the Kharkiv more than once, leading to the promotion of Shubnikov's work in the United Kingdom.

The discovery of type-II superconductivity went mostly forgotten for a few decades. In the Soviet Union, the Shubnikov superconductivity papers were rediscovered in post-1957 by theoretical physicist Alexei Abrikosov who was looking for data to compare with his theory. This work was brought to the attention by B. B. Goodman who talk about it during superconductivity conferences as early as 1961. In 1962, the experiments of Shubikov were reproduced by J. D. Livinstong in General Electric Research Labs. John Bardeen and Raymond W. Schmitt, leading 1963 International Conference on the Science of Superconductivity at Colgate University, said: "our theoretical understanding of type II superconductors is due mainly to Landau, [Vitaly] Ginzburg, Abrikosov, and [Lev] Gor'kov, and that the first definitive experiments were carried out as early as 1937 by Shubnikov".

Many follow up papers, started citing back Shubnikov's publications. Kurt Mendelssohn expressed in 1966: "The real trouble here is that it is extremely difficult to make a homogeneous alloy, containing no lattice faults. Of the laboratories engaged in low temperature research in the thirties, Shubnikov's group in Kharkov had evidently the best metallurgical know-how".

Similarly in 2004, Ginzburg said:

Shubnikov and his students and colleagues accomplished a lot within only a few years, and I should specially mention his studies of superconducting alloys and the factual discovery of type II superconductors... I am sure that Shubnikov would have achieved even greater success in science, and one cannot but feel bitterness about his untimely (at the age of only 36!) and quite guiltless death under the axe of Stalin's terror.

Pierre-Gilles de Gennes coined the term Shubnikov phase, to refer to superconductors in the presence of a magnetic field in between the critical fields H_{c1} and H_{c2}.

== Honors ==
The Shubnikov Prize has been established by the Russian Academy of Sciences.

Boris G. Lazarev, colleague of Shubnikov became the head of the renamed Lev Shubnikov Low Temperature Laboratory at the National Scientific Center Kharkiv Institute of Physics and Technology in Kharkiv, Ukraine from 1938 - 1989.

On Shubnikov birth centenary in 2001, a special issue of the Russian journal Low Temperature Physics was devoted to his work (1937 was chosen as his death date).
