= Konrad Weisselberg =

Soviet chemist and Great Purge victim

- Born: Konrad Weisselberg; 25 October 1905; Bârlad, Romania
- Died: 16 December 1937 (aged 32)
- Known for: Execution in the Great Purge

Konrad Weisselberg was a chemist in the Soviet Union. He was executed as part of the Great Purge due to his association with the UPTI Affair.

== Biography ==
Konrad Weisselberg was born in Bârlad, Romania on 25 October 1905 to an affluent Jewish family; Weisselberg's father was a relatively wealthy timber trader. In 1907, amidst an outbreak of anti-Semitic violence, the Weisselbergs moved to Czernowitz in the Austro-Hungarian Empire. Weisselberg again moved in 1914 while in primary school due to the outbreak of World War I, with his family settling in Vienna away from the frontline. During his adolescence, Weisselberg joined the Association of Socialist Middle School Students.

In 1925, Weisselberg became a student at the University of Vienna, and was a leader in the Socialist Students’ Association during his time there. In 1930, he successfully defended his doctoral thesis. He took up employment at the Drösing refinery near the border between Austria and Czechoslovakia.

Weisselberg joined the Communist Party of Austria in December 1933 following the ascent to power of the fascist Engelbert Dollfuss and after visiting the Soviet Union in May 1933, gaining a positive impression of the country's rapid industrialisation. On 18 July 1934, Weisselberg moved to the Soviet Union following the Österreichischer Bürgerkrieg after his friend Alexander Weissberg, who had extensive connections in the Soviet Ministry of Heavy Industry, had offered him a job. He visited Vienna twice after his move, once in 1935 and once in 1936.

On 5 March 1937, Weisselberg was detained by the NKVD after a search of his home that occurred four days after Weissberg was arrested on 1 March 1937. In June of that year, Weisselberg was interrogated about Weissberg's alleged involvement in a "counter-revolutionary" group at UPTI, which Weisselberg denied having any knowledge of. This denial came after the NKVD had extracted a confession from Weissberg of being involved in such a group. Weisselberg was not interrogated again after June 1937 nor tried for his alleged crimes; instead, his name was placed on a "shooting list" on 28 October 1937 signed by Nikolai Yezhov and Andrei Vyshinsky, leading to Weisselberg's execution without trial on 16 December 1937.
