= Riefenstahl =

Riefenstahl may refer to:

- Charlotte Riefenstahl (1899–1993), German physicist
- Leni Riefenstahl (1902–2003), German filmmaker, photographer, and actress
  - Riefenstahl (film), 2024 German documentary film about Leni Riefenstahl
