= Shtepa =

Shtepa (Russian and Ukrainian: Штепа), also spelled as Shteppa, is a gender-neutral Slavic surname. Notable people with the surname include:

- Aleksandr Shtepa (born 1979), Russian decathlete
- Konstantin Shteppa (1896–1958), Soviet, German and American historian of Ukrainian descent
- Nelya Shtepa (born 1962), Ukrainian politician
- Vadim Shtepa (born 1970), Russian philosopher, publicist, and analyst of Russian regions
