= Tube-based nanostructure =

Tube-based nanostructures are nanolattices made of connected tubes and exhibit nanoscale organization above the molecular level.

== Lattices ==
Lattices are structures formed of arrays of uniformly sized cells. Ceramic lattice nanostructures have been formed using hollow tubes of titanium nitride (TiN). Using vertex-connected, tessellated octahedra with 7-nm hollow struts with elliptical cross-sections and wall thickness of 75-nm produced approximately cubic cells 100-nm on a side at a scale of up to 1 cubic millimeter. The material's relative density was of the order of 0.013 (similar to aerogels).

Compression experiments with multiple deformation cycles revealed tensile strengths of 1.75 GPa without failure.

The material was constructed from a digital design with direct laser writing onto a photopolymer using 2-photon lithography followed by conformal deposition of TiN using atomic layer deposition and a final etching to remove the polymer.

An earlier metallic tube lattice produced hollow tube nickel microlattices with a density of .9 milligram per cubic centimeter and complete recovery after compression exceeding 50% strain with energy absorption similar to elastomers. Young's modulus E scales with density as E ~ ρ2, in contrast to the E ~ ρ3 scaling observed for ultralight aerogels and carbon nanotube nanofoams with stochastic architecture. Hardness of 6 GPa and a modulus of 210 GPa were measured by nanoindentation and hollow tube compression experiments, respectively. These materials are fabricated by starting with a template formed by self-propagating photopolymer waveguide prototyping, coating the template by electroless nickel plating, and subsequently etching away the template.

== Organic nanostructures ==
Nanostructured hollow multilayered tubes can be created by combining layer-by-layer (LbL) and template leaching. Such materials are of particular interest for tissue engineering since they allow the precise control of physical and biochemical cues of implantable devices. The tubes are based on polyelectrolyte multilayer films. The final tubular structures can be characterized by differential scanning calorimetry (DSC), Fourier transform infrared spectroscopy (FTIR), microscopy, swelling and mechanical tests, including dynamic mechanical analysis (DMA) in physiological simulated conditions. More robust films could be produced via chemical cross-linking with genipin. Water uptake decreases from about 390% to 110% after cross-linking. The cross-linked tubes are more suitable structures for cell adhesion and spreading. Potential applications include tissue engineering.

== See also ==
- Nanolattice
- Superlattice
- Nanostructure
