= Kharkiv Institute of Physics and Technology =

Research institute in Kharkiv, Ukraine

National Science Center Kharkiv Institute of Physics and Technology
- Національний науковий центр «Харківський фізико-технічний інститут»
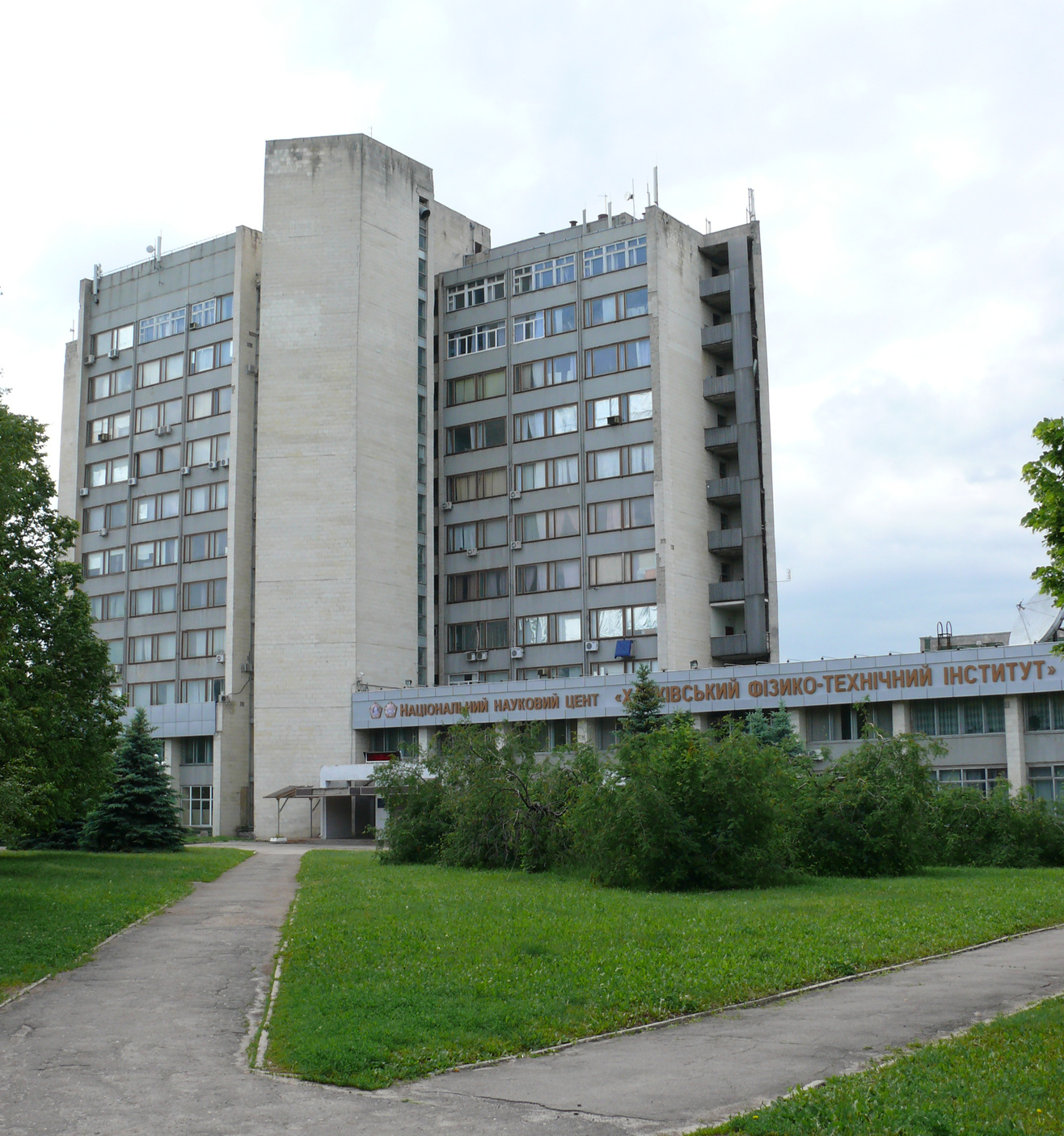
- National Science Center, Kharkiv Institute of Physics and Technology
- Established: 30 October 1928; 97 years ago
- Research type: Research institute
- Director: Nikolay Shulga (2017–2024)
- Location: 50.090°N 36.250°E
- Operating agency: National Academy of Sciences of Ukraine
- Website: www.kipt.kharkov.ua/en/bhr.html

The National Science Center Kharkiv Institute of Physics and Technology (KIPT) (Ukrainian: Національний науковий центр «Харківський фізико-технічний інститут»), formerly the Ukrainian Physics and Technology Institute (UPTI) is the oldest and largest physical science research centre in Ukraine. Today it is known as a science center as it consists of several institutes that are part of the Kharkiv Institute of Physics and Technology science complex.

== History ==
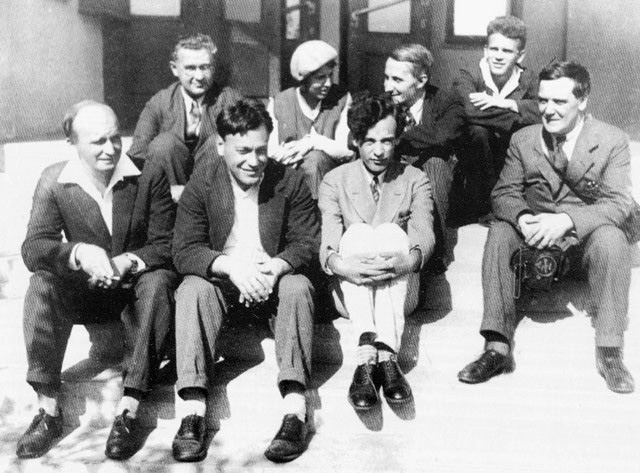
Group photo of the KIPT physicists in 1934

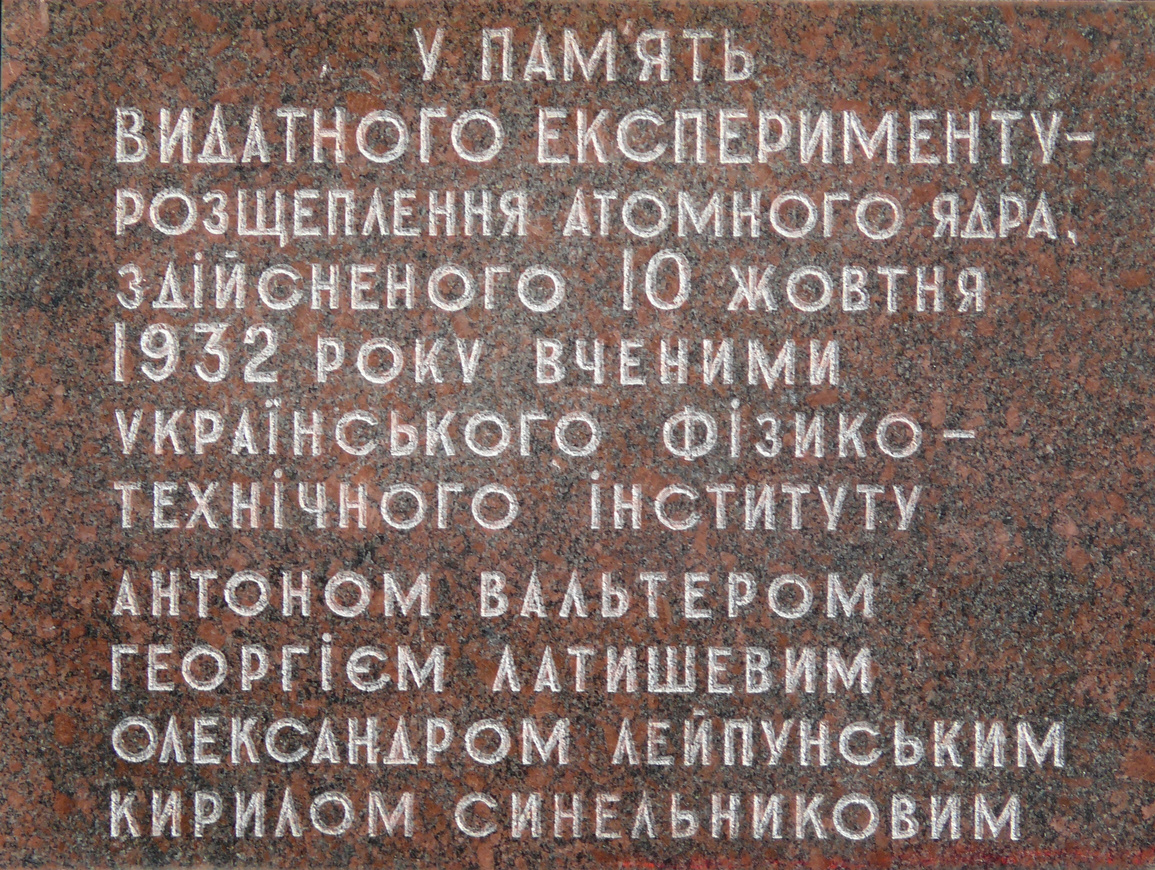
Commemorative plaque about the nuclear fission conducted in 1932

The institute was founded on 30 October 1928, by the Government of Soviet Ukraine on an initiative of Abram Ioffe on the northern outskirts of Kharkiv (in khutir Piatykhatky) as the Ukrainian Institute of Physics and Technology for the purpose of research on nuclear physics and condensed matter physics.

From the moment of its creation, the institute was run by the People's Commissariat of Heavy Industry.

On 10 October 1932 the first experiments in nuclear fission in the Soviet Union were conducted here. The Soviet nuclear physicists Anton Valter, Georgiy Latyshev, Cyril Sinelnikov, and Aleksandr Leipunskii used a lithium atom nucleus. Later the Ukrainian Institute of Physics and Technology was able to obtain liquid hydrogen and helium. They also constructed the first triple coordinate radar station, and the institute became a pioneer of the Soviet high vacuum engineering which was developed into an industrial vacuum metallurgy.

During Stalin's Great Terror in 1938, the institute suffered the so-called UPTI Affair: three leading physicists of the Kharkiv Institute (Lev Landau, Yuri Rumer and Moisey Korets) were arrested by the Soviet secret police.

The Ukrainian Institute of Physics and Technology was the "Laboratory no. 1" for nuclear physics, and was responsible for the first conceptual development of a nuclear bomb in the USSR.

A center for research into the stellarator device type for fusion energy production was created by Cyril Sinelnikov in 1956 with the support of Igor Kurchatov. It was the site of the world's first torsatron-type stellarator, Saturn-1. Today it is the site of the larger Uragan-2M torsatron experiment.

It was damaged by shelling during the 2022 Russian invasion of Ukraine, resulting in heavy damage to the Neutron Source nuclear facility. It is guarded by the 4th State Objects Protection Regiment.

== Directors ==
- 1929–1933: Ivan Obreimov
- 1933–1934: Aleksandr Leipunskii
- 1934–1936: Semyon Davidovich
- 1936–1938: Aleksandr Leipunskii
- 1938–1941: Aleksandr Shpetny
- 1944–1965: Cyril Sinelnikov
- 1965–1980: Victor Ivanov
- 1980–1996: Viktor Zelensky
- 1996–2004: Vladimir Lapshin
- 2004–2017: Ivan Neklyudov
- 2017–2024: Nikolay Shulga

== Important institutes ==
Science and education institutions in Pyatykhatky.

=== Kharkiv Institute of Physics and Technology ===
- The Lev Shubnikov Low Temperature Laboratory at the Ukrainian Institute of Physics and Technology was founded in 1931. Lev Shubnikov was a head of the cryogenic laboratory at the Ukrainian Physics and Technology Institute in 1931–1937. In 1935, Rjabinin, Schubnikow experimentally discovered the Type-II superconductors at the cryogenic laboratory at the institute.
- Institute of condensed matter physics, materials studies and technology
- Plasma physics institute, Institute of high energy and nuclear physics
- Institute of plasma electronics and new methods of acceleration
- Akhiezer Institute of theoretical physics

=== Other institutes ===
- Kharkiv University faculty of physics and technology, located nearby.

== Notable alumni ==
- Aleksander Akhiezer
- Naum Akhiezer
- Semion Braude
- Dmitri Ivanenko
- Fritz Houtermans
- Arnold Kosevich
- Eduard Kuraev
- Igor Kurchatov
- Lev Landau
- Oleg Lavrentiev
- Aleksandr Leipunskii
- Ilya Lifshitz
- Evgeny Lifshitz
- Boris Podolsky
- Isaak Pomeranchuk
- Antonina Prikhot'ko
- Lev Shubnikov
- Cyril Sinelnikov
- László Tisza

== See also ==
- List of science centers
