= Harrison Brown =

American physicist and geochemist

Harrison Scott Brown
- Born: September 26, 1917; Sheridan, Wyoming
- Died: December 8, 1986 (aged 69); Albuquerque, New Mexico
- Education: University of California; Johns Hopkins University
- Spouse(s): Adele Scrimger (divorced); Rudd Owen (divorced); Theresa Tellez
- Awards: Newcomb Cleveland Prize (1947); ACS Award in Pure Chemistry (1952)
- Scientific career
- Fields: Nuclear chemistry Geochemistry
- Workplaces: Metallurgical Laboratory; Clinton Engineering Works; University of Chicago; California Institute of Technology
- Thesis: Part I. The construction of a mass spectrometer for isotope analysis. Part II. Intermolecular forces in gases and thermal diffusion: the thermal diffusion coefficient of argon at low temperatures (1941)
- Doctoral advisor: Robert D. Fowler
- Doctoral students: Edward D. Goldberg; Clair Cameron Patterson
- Other notable students: George Tilton

Harrison Scott Brown (September 26, 1917 – December 8, 1986) was an American nuclear chemist and geochemist. He was a political activist, who lectured and wrote on the issues of arms limitation, natural resources and world hunger.

Brown grew up in San Francisco, California where he graduated from Galileo High School in 1934. During World War II, Brown worked at the Manhattan Project's Metallurgical Laboratory and Clinton Engineer Works, where he worked on ways to separate plutonium from uranium. The techniques he helped develop were used at the Hanford Site to produce the plutonium used in the Fat Man bomb dropped on Nagasaki. After the war he lectured on the dangers of nuclear weapons.

After the war, he worked at the University of Chicago, where he pioneered nuclear geochemistry. The study of meteorites by Brown and his students led to the first close approximation of the age of the Earth and the solar system. Between 1951 and 1977, he worked at the California Institute of Technology (Caltech) where he contributed to advances in telescopic instrumentation, jet propulsion, and infrared astronomy. In the early 1970s, he began working more directly on the resource/environment issues that he had been developing in his books. In 1977, he became director of the newly created Resource Systems Institute of the East-West Center in Hawaii where he turned full time to work on understanding and influencing the interactions of energy, mineral, and food systems in the Asia-Pacific Region, themes he had developed in his books since the 1950s.

== Manhattan Project ==
In 1942 Glenn T. Seaborg invited Brown to work with him at the University of Chicago in the Manhattan Project's Metallurgical Laboratory, working on ways to separate plutonium from uranium. The Manhattan Project intended to create plutonium by irradiating uranium in a nuclear reactor. The resulting highly radioactive product would then have to be chemically separated from the uranium and any fission products created by the irradiation process. The problem was that plutonium was a new element with chemical properties that were not yet fully known. Until a reactor could be built, it was available only in microgram amount, so an industrial separation process would have to be scaled up one billion times. With Orville Hill, Brown devised a successful method of achieving this by using the gaseous evaporation of fluorides.

Brown and some of his colleagues to the Oak Ridge, Tennessee, to work with the X-10 Graphite Reactor at Clinton Engineer Works, where he became the assistant director of chemistry. Working with the reactor there, they developed the separation processes for producing kilogram quantities of plutonium. The techniques discovered by the team proved to be the groundwork for those used at the Hanford Site which provided the plutonium for the Fat Man bomb dropped on Nagasaki on August 9, 1945. Just four months later he completed Must Destruction Be Our Destiny? (1945), a book detailing the dangers of nuclear weapons. He gave 102 lectures to promote the book, donating the royalties from the book to an organisation that later became part of the Federation of American Scientists.

== Later life ==
In 1946, Brown returned to the University of Chicago to work as an assistant professor of chemistry in the Institute for Nuclear Studies. He was joined by some of his former colleagues from the Manhattan Project and together they became the first team to study nuclear geochemistry. He went on to study meteorites and planetary structures along with ways to date the age of the Earth, encouraging George Tilton and Clair Patterson to investigate the isotopic composition of iron meteorites. Patterson's studies of lead eventually led to the first close approximation of the age of the Earth and the Solar System of 4.5 billion years. Another of his doctoral students, Edward D. Goldberg, measured trace occurrences of gallium, gold, palladium, and rhenium in meteorites, he was able to group iron meteorites based on their geochemical composition. In 1948 Brown was awarded the American Association for the Advancement of Science prize for his work on meteorites.

Between 1951 and 1977, Brown was professor of geochemistry at the California Institute of Technology (Caltech). While there he attracted several former colleagues and highly regarded scientists to the team. Together they made advancements in telescopic instrumentation, jet propulsion (contributing to NASA's early planetary exploration missions), and infrared astronomy. In June 1954 he was one of twenty scientists under the age of forty identified by Fortune Magazine as "top young scientists in U. S. universities and industry".

Brown was elected to the National Academy of Sciences in 1955 and was appointed as their foreign secretary in January 1962, a role that he would hold until 1974. He was elected in 1959 a member of the American Academy of Arts and Sciences, in 1962 a fellow of the American Geophysical Union, and in 1966 a member of the American Philosophical Society. He demonstrated an interest in the scientific interactions between the United States and Eastern Europe. Len Ackland noted that "Geochemistry and his travels in developing countries caused him to ponder the adequacy of the Earth's resources and the problems of development, hunger and population growth." These were themes that he would expound on in his next three books: The Challenge of Man's Future (1954), The Next Hundred Years (1957) and The Human Future Revisited (1978). He also wrote a science fiction novel, The Cassiopeia Affair with Chloe Zerwick. He divorced Adele and married Rudd Owen, who collaborated with him on his writings and social activism. "Man has it within his power today," he said in 1976, "to create a world in which people the world over can lead free and abundant and even creative lives. I am convinced that we can create a world which will pale the Golden Age of Pericles into nothingness."

In the early 1970s, he began focusing more on the issues he had developed in his books, including working with a post-doctorate fellow, John P. Holdren, who later became President Barack Obama's Science Advisor (2009-2017). Brown was appointed first director of the Resource System Institute at the East–West Center (EWC) in Honolulu. Located adjacent to the University of Hawaii campus in Manoa, the EWC was a research and educational institution focused on problems in the Asia-Pacific Region. He put together a team of scientists from across the US to follow through even more directly on the ideas he developed in his books, i.e. to explore the sustainability of energy, minerals, and food systems and how they interacted with population and environment.

In 1983, in failing health, Brown retired and moved to Albuquerque, New Mexico with his third wife, Theresa Tellez, his second marriage having also ended in divorce. He became a regular columnist and editor-in-chief of the Bulletin of the Atomic Scientists. In his last years, Brown battled lung cancer, the treatment for which had resulted in progressive paralysis through the irradiation of his spine. He died in the University of New Mexico Hospital in Albuquerque on December 8, 1986. He was survived by his third wife Theresa and his son Eric.

== Selected publications ==
- Must Destruction Be Our Destiny? (1945)
- The Challenge of Man's Future (1954)
- The Next Hundred Years (1957)
- The Cassiopeia Affair with Chloe Zerwick (1968)
- The Human Future Revisited (1978)
