= Vadim Gorsky =

Vadim Sergeevich Gorsky (Russian: Bадим Горский; 1 May 1905 – possibly 8 November 1937) was a Russian and Soviet physicist who studied alloy structures using x-ray crystallography studies. He is remembered in the Gorsky-Bragg-Williams approximation and the Gorsky effect. He was killed during the Stalinist purge for his refusal to submit to government demands.

Gorsky was born in Gatchina, south of St. Petersburg and his father had likely been either a priest or a railway engineer. His mother Ljubov Grigorevna Nadezhdina (1881–1914) was the daughter of physician Grigory Grigorevich Nadezhdin (1851–1921). When he was a boy of nine in 1913, he was witness to the killing of his mother who was shot dead by the husband of Olga, an older sister of Vadim. Little is known of his early life except from notes made during his interrogation by the NKVD. Around 1922 Vadim joined the physics faculty and began to work in Ivan Obreimov's laboratory at the Leningrad Polytechnic Institute. He moved to Kharkov when Obreimov moved in 1927. He published a paper in 1928 on transformations in a copper-gold alloy based on x-ray diffraction studies. Here he noted that the atomic mean-field order-disorder transformation depended only on the average degree of chemical order rather than the configurations of neighbouring atoms. While he restricted his studies only to copper-gold alloys, Lawrence Bragg and Evan James Williams expanded on this in 1934-35 and this led to the Gorsky-Bragg-Williams approximation. In 1930 he led the x-ray structure analysis team in Kharkov headed by Obreimov. Lev Shubnikov worked in the cryogenics department while the theoretical physics department was led by Lev Landau. Landau was strict in grading students and some students complained to the government in 1936. The government forced Landau to resign and Gorsky and some others also wrote resignation letters in solidarity. This led the government to arrest Obreimov, Shubnikov, and Lev Rozenkevich on 6 August 1937 and Gorsky a bit later on 21 September. In the following interrogations by the NKVD Obreimov and Shubnikov were coerced to provide evidence that Landau was a tough professor but Gorsky did not concede. It is believed that Gorsky was shot dead shortly after as were Shubnikov and Rozenkevich but some rumours existed that he was tortured in prison and killed later. The official records claimed that they were members of the counter-revolutionary Trotskyist organisation. Gorsky in his statements had stated that he was unaware of any such organization in his last (recorded) interrogation on 26 September 1937. He was married to another scientist Nina Vasilevna Danilevskaja and they had a daughter of their own and a son from a previous marriage.
