= Cu-Pt type ordering in III-V semiconductor =

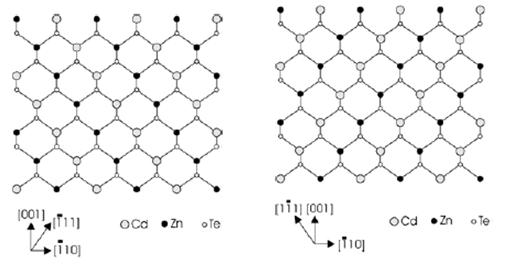
Example of Cu-Pt type ordering in Cd-Zn-Te alloy.

One of the most studied atomic ordering is CuPt type ordering in III-V semiconductor alloy in chemistry and physics. It occurs in III-V alloy when the cation planes take an alternate sequence of A-rich and B-rich plane following A_{x}B_{1−x}C. The resulting structure is usually called as superlattice-like structure along [1-11] or [-111] – called (111) B plane, or along [-1-1-1] or [11-1] – called (111) A plane. The two ordering direction is thus called CuPt type A and B ordering.

The same type ordering is also observed in II-VI alloy such as CdZnTe alloy. The ordering sequence viewed on atomic planes along [-111] and [1-11] reveals Cd and Zn alternating planes.

This ordering reduces the lattice symmetry ordering to L11 and leads to change of its optical and electrical properties. The apparent effects are: band gap reduction, valence band splitting, and optical anisotropy. For instance, in CuPt type B ordering, the L point of the Brillouin zone fold back to the Γ-point, and the folded band “repels” the original conduction band minimum and bring down the bottom of conduction band.

AlInP epilayers grown by metal-organic vapour-phase epitaxy on GaAs substrates exhibit CuPt-B-type spontaneous atomic ordering. Additionally, CuPt-type structures were observed in CdZnTe during metal-organic vapor phase epitaxy.
