= Two Prosecutors =

2025 film by Sergei Loznitsa

- German promotional poster
- German: Zwei Staatsanwälte
- Directed by: Sergei Loznitsa
- Screenplay by: Sergei Loznitsa
- Based on: Two Prosecutors by Georgy Demidov
- Produced by: Kevin Chneiweiss
- Starring: Aleksandr Kuznetsov; Aleksandr Filippenko; Anatoliy Beliy; Andris Keišs; Vytautas Kaniušonis; Valentin Novopolskij; Dmitrij Denisiuk
- Cinematography: Oleg Mutu
- Edited by: Danielius Kokanauskis
- Music by: Christiaan Verbeek
- Production companies: Atoms & Void; White Picture; LOOKSfilm; SBS Productions; Avanpost Media; Studio Uljana Kim
- Distributed by: Pyramide (France); Progress (Germany)
- Release dates: 14 May 2025 (Cannes); 5 November 2025 (France)
- Running time: 117 minutes
- Countries: France; Germany; Romania; Latvia; Netherlands; Lithuania
- Languages: Russian; Ukrainian

Two Prosecutors (German: Zwei Staatsanwälte) is a 2025 historical drama film written and directed by Sergei Loznitsa, based on the novella of the same name by Georgy Demidov. Starring Aleksandr Kuznetsov and Aleksandr Filippenko, the film follows a young Soviet prosecutor seeking justice for a political prisoner during Joseph Stalin's ongoing Great Purge.

The film had its world premiere in the main competition of the 78th Cannes Film Festival on 14 May 2025, where it won the François Chalais Prize. It was theatrically released by Progress in Germany on 19 February 2026.

== Plot ==
In 1937, amid Joseph Stalin's Great Purge, Kornyev, a young Soviet prosecutor who recently graduated from law school, comes across a letter written by a prisoner in Bryansk. Believing the man to be the victim of NKVD corruption, he obtains a visit through his oversight role in the local prosecutor's office.

Despite the prison director's excuses, Kornyev insists on meeting Stepniak, an imprisoned Old Bolshevik and local party stalwart. He earns the old man's trust by recounting how he had attended one of Stepniak's speeches about truth and Bolshevism at his law school. Stepniak shows Kornyev torture wounds received after refusing to falsely confess and begs him to tell Stalin or members of the Politburo about the wrongful convictions and illegal actions taken against loyal citizens who learn of or resist the NKVD's corruption. As Kornyev leaves, the prison director observing him makes a phone call while insulting his intelligence.

Kornyev travels to Moscow by train and tries to sleep. However, he is constantly woken up by a peglegged World War I veteran of the Battle of Kowel telling a story about how he had visited Vladimir Lenin in Smolny and had eventually gotten alms and was now seeking the same from Stalin.

At the Procurator General's office, Kornyev struggles to navigate the Soviet bureaucracy but is given a chance at an appointment after an earnest plea to Procurator General Andrey Vyshinsky's secretary. After enduring a long wait, Kornyev meets Vyshinsky, tells him about the conditions in Bryansk, and shows him Stepniak's bloody letter. Kornyev also explains that he came directly to Vyshinsky because he fears the local prosecutor's office is cowed by the local NKVD. Vyshinsky tells him that without strong documentary evidence, his office cannot open an inquiry into the NKVD and sends him back to Bryansk with documents authorizing him to conduct further investigations.

On the train back, Kornyev is seated with Vasily and Petya, who introduce themselves as engineers before giving toasts to Soviet law and playing the counterplan song on guitar for him. In Bryansk, the three share a ride out of the train station and Petya aggressively questions Kornyev about his virginity before they drive past Kornyev's destination. Vasily tells Kornyev that he is under arrest and the car enters the prison facility.

== Cast ==
- Aleksandr Kuznetsov as Kornyev, a young Soviet prosecutor
- Aleksandr Filippenko as Stepniak / Pegleg, an Old Bolshevik falsely imprisoned in Bryansk and a World War I veteran of the Battle of Kowel
- Anatoliy Beliy as Andrey Vyshinsky, the Procurator General of the Soviet Union
- Andris Keišs
- Vytautas Kaniušonis
- Valentin Novopolskij
- Dmitrij Denisiuk

== Production ==
Two Prosecutors is a co-production between Saïd Ben Saïd, Loznitsa’s Dutch production company Atoms & Void, and four other countries: Germany, Latvia, Romania and Lithuania. Principal photography took place in Riga. The production team shot scenes in Old Riga, as well as in the former Brasa Prison that was built in 1905. Filming wrapped on 25 October 2024.

== Release ==
Coproduction Office acquired the sales rights to the film in February 2025. The film will be distributed by Pyramide in France and Progress in Germany. Ahead of its premiere, the film was also acquired for distribution by Lucky Red in Italy; Aerofilms in the Czech Republic and Slovakia; Vertigo Media in Hungary; HBO Europe in eastern Europe; Filmstop in Estonia; MegaCom Film in Bosnia and Herzegovina, Croatia, Montenegro, North Macedonia, Serbia, and Slovenia; Lev in Israel; and Falcon Films in the Middle East.

The film had its world premiere in competition at the 78th Cannes Film Festival on 14 May 2025. Following its premiere, it was acquired by Wanda Visión and Filmin for Spain; Edge Entertainment for the Nordics and Iceland; Aurora Films for Poland; Filmtrade for Greece; Bir Film for Turkey; Sharmill Films for Australia and New Zealand; Longride for Japan; Andrews Film for Taiwan; Edko Films for Hong Kong; Impact for India; Falcon Pictures for Indonesia; Retrato Filmes for Brazil; and Zeta Films for Argentina, Chile, Uruguay, and Paraguay. Janus Films acquired the North American distribution rights on 24 June 2025.

The film was also screened at the 31st Sarajevo Film Festival in August, and had its North American premiere at the Toronto International Film Festival in September 2025. It also screened at the 2025 BFI London Film Festival and the Adelaide Film Festival in October 2025.

It received a theatrical release in Germany on 18 December 2025.

== Reception ==
On the review aggregator website Rotten Tomatoes, 98% of 80 critics' reviews are positive, with an average rating of 8.1/10. The website's critical consensus states: "Anchored by Sergei Loznitsa's impeccable staging and Aleksandr Kuznetsov's haunting performance, Two Prosecutors delivers its chilling portrait of bureaucratic deception and lost idealism with quiet, unsettling power". Metacritic, which uses a weighted average, assigned the film a score of 85 out of 100, based on 24 critics, indicating "universal acclaim".

Peter Bradshaw of The Guardian gave the film a rating of five stars out of five, calling it "starkly austere and gripping ". Jordan Mintzer of The Hollywood Reporter wrote, "Impeccably directed and impressively acted, this slow-burn story of political injustice is filled to the brim with atmosphere — specifically the stifling, claustrophobic atmosphere of the U.S.S.R. at the height of Stalin’s Great Purge." Jessica Kiang of Variety wrote, "[T]his is not the kind of movie that hinges on abrupt reveals or gratuitous twists. Indeed, the banal predictability of Kornyev's slowly mounting humiliations and disillusionments is very much the point. The film's fascination lies in its fabric, the devastation in its detail...." She praised Oleg Mutu's cinematography, Christiaan Verbeek's score, and Jurij Grigorovič and Aldis Meinerts's production design. Damon Wise of Deadline noted that the film was "a bleak warning from history" and commended the film's set design and relevance to current events. In a review for The New York Times, Nicolas Rapold wrote: "Mordantly comedic, 'Two Prosecutors' is deliberately paced but makes a tightly conceived addition to Loznitsa’s work, which rides deep into the long, dark nights of Russian history with fiction, observational documentary and immersions in the Soviet archives."

=== Accolades ===
Award	Date of ceremony	Category	Recipient(s)	Result	Ref.
Cannes Film Festival	24 May 2025	Palme d'Or	Sergei Loznitsa	Nominated	
Cannes Film Festival	24 May 2025	François Chalais Prize	Sergei Loznitsa	Won	
Cinema for Peace Awards	16 February 2026	Cinema for Peace Dove for The Most Valuable Film of the Year	Two Prosecutors	Nominated	
