= Georgy Demidov =

Russian writer (1908–1987)

- Born: November 29, 1908; St. Petersburg, Russia
- Died: February 19, 1987; Kaluga, Russia
- Occupation: Writer
- Writing career
- Genre: Short story

Georgy Demidov (Russian: Гео́ргий Гео́ргиевич Деми́дов; November 29, 1908 – February 19, 1987) was a Soviet physicist, political prisoner and writer.

Born in Saint Petersburg to a working-class family, Demidov showed technical and engineering gifts at an early age. He graduated from Kharkiv University, he was a student of Lev Landau.

In the winter of 1938, as a part of the so-called UPTI Affair, he was arrested in Kharkiv, where he was working at the Kharkov Electrotechnical Institute as an experimentation physicist, after being served a summons for an internal passport check. It was a check that was to last eighteen years. His interrogator threatened to arrest Demidov's wife, and orphan his five-month-old daughter. Demidov confessed and was sentenced as a Trotskyist, but did not accuse anyone else, and was sent to corrective labor camps.

For fourteen years he served in the Kolyma region of Siberia, ten in the most brutal of conditions. In 1946, he received a second sentence, after which he sent a telegram to his wife that was in the form of an official telegram informing her of his death. In the main camp hospital, Demidov became acquainted and then a friend to a hospital assistant, the future writer Varlam Shalamov.

On March 20, 1958, Demidov was rehabilitated by the Supreme Court of the USSR.

In August 1980 his entire corpus of work was seized.

In July 1988, due to the order of Alexander Nikolaevich Yakovlev, a secretary in the Central Committee of the Communist Party of the Soviet Union, the seized documents were returned to his daughter.

He wrote several stories on labor camp themes, two of which were published in Novy Mir (1997, Volume 5, pp. 116–145) – "People Die for Metal" ("Люди гибнут за металл") – a title drawn from a statement of Mephistopheles in 'Faust' by Goethe – and "The Artist Baccilla and his Wonders" ("Художник Бацилла и его шедевр"). Unlike other writers of the camps, Demidov remains comparatively unknown and untranslated.

In 2008, on the centenary of his birth, his stories, collected by his daughter, were published in book form as "Чудная планета" (Miraculous Planet) (ISBN 9785715702197) by Возвращение press.

In 2025 the film Two Prosecutors by Sergei Loznitsa was released, based on Demidov's novella with the same title.
