= Clair Patterson =

American geochemist (1922–1995)

Clair Cameron Patterson
- Born: Claire Cameron Patterson Jr. June 2, 1922; Des Moines, Iowa, U.S.
- Died: December 5, 1995 (aged 73); Sea Ranch, California, U.S.
- Education: Grinnell College (BS); University of Iowa (MS); University of Chicago (PhD)
- Known for: Uranium–lead dating, age of the Earth, lead contamination
- Spouse: Laurie Patterson (m. 1944)
- Children: 4
- Awards: Tyler Prize (1995); V. M. Goldschmidt Award (1980); J. Lawrence Smith Medal (1973)
- Scientific career
- Fields: Geochemistry
- Workplaces: California Institute of Technology
- Thesis: The Isotopic Composition of Trace Quantities of Lead and Calcium (1951)
- Doctoral advisor: Harrison Brown

Clair Cameron Patterson (born Claire Cameron Patterson Jr.; June 2, 1922 – December 5, 1995) was an American geochemist. Born in Des Moines and raised in nearby Mitchellville, Iowa, he graduated from Grinnell College. He later received his Ph.D. from the University of Chicago and spent his entire professional career at the California Institute of Technology (Caltech).

In collaboration with George Tilton, Patterson developed the lead–lead dating method, adapting established procedures for uranium–lead dating. By using lead isotopic data from the Canyon Diablo meteorite, he calculated an age for the Earth of 4.55 billion years, a figure far more accurate than estimates existing at the time and one that has remained largely unchallenged since 1956.

Patterson first encountered ubiquitous lead contamination in the late 1940s as a graduate student at the University of Chicago. Later, his work on this subject led to a major reevaluation in the United States and worldwide of the unregulated growth of industrial lead concentrations in the atmosphere and human body. His activism on this issue proved seminal in the banning of leaded gasoline and leaded solder in food cans.

== Early life ==
Patterson was born in Des Moines and raised in Mitchellville, Iowa. His father was a mail carrier, and his mother served on the local school board. He had a brother and a sister. From a young age, he displayed intellectual curiosity. He graduated from high school in 1939 at the age of 16 and enrolled at nearby Grinnell College, where he studied chemistry and met his future wife, Lorna "Laurie" McCleary. He received a bachelor's degree in chemistry in 1943.

Patterson and McCleary both attended graduate school at the University of Iowa, where he earned an M.A. in molecular spectroscopy and they married in 1944. They subsequently worked as civilian scientists on the Manhattan Project, first at the University of Chicago and later at Oak Ridge, Tennessee, where Patterson specialized in mass spectrometry.

After World War II, the Pattersons returned to Chicago, where Laurie worked as an infrared spectroscopist while Patterson pursued a Ph.D. under Harrison Brown at the University of Chicago. During his doctoral research, Patterson discovered that lead contamination was pervasive throughout his laboratory, even in his own hair. This finding sparked his long-term interest in environmental lead pollution and led to pioneering studies demonstrating the widespread presence of toxic lead in the atmosphere and the environment.

Following a postdoctoral year at the University of Chicago, Patterson and Brown moved to the California Institute of Technology (Caltech) in Pasadena, California, in 1952 as founding members of Caltech's new geochemistry program, now part of the Division of Geological and Planetary Sciences. Patterson remained at Caltech for the rest of his life. He and Laurie had four children.

== Measurement of the Earth's age ==
Patterson's postdoc work at the University of Chicago was under Harrison Brown, who teamed him with George Tilton to study geological aging of zircon crystals. Zircon is extremely useful for geological dating: when forming, it collects tiny imperfections of uranium, but never lead. It follows that if lead is present in zircon, it must have come from decay of the uranium present. (The process is known as U-Pb dating.) The team measured the concentrations and isotopic compositions of foreign elements inside the zircon. Tilton measured the uranium and Patterson the types and amounts of lead. Patterson's goal was to calculate the composition of primordial lead in the Earth. Then it would be possible to calculate the age of the Earth—and, in turn, of the Solar System by using the same techniques on meteorites.

After beginning their work in 1948, Patterson soon noted that his lead samples were being contaminated. The age of the igneous rock from which the zircon came was known, and Tilton's uranium measurements aligned with what was expected in the zircon at that particular age; but Patterson's data typically was skewed with "too much" lead. After six years, the team published a paper on methods of determining the ages of zircon crystals and Patterson earned his Ph.D., but they were no closer in determining the age of the Earth.

Brown received a grant from the United States Atomic Energy Commission to continue work on dating the Earth, but more importantly, he was selected to commission a new mass spectrometer in Pasadena, California at Caltech. In 1953, Brown and Patterson arrived at Caltech, where Patterson was authorized to build his own lab from scratch. He proceeded to secure all points of entry from air and other contaminants. He acid-cleaned all apparatuses and even distilled all chemicals shipped to him. In essence, Patterson created one of the first laboratory clean rooms, here to prevent lead contamination of his work and his data. He finished his analysis of the Canyon Diablo meteorite in 1953, and used the mass spectrometer at the Argonne National Laboratory on isolated iron-meteorite lead to collect data on the abundance of lead isotopes. With the new data, he published "Age of Meteorites and the Earth" in 1956, the first paper explaining the "true" age of the solar system's accretion as 4.550Gy ± 70My; a figure that has remained largely unchallenged since.

Before his paper, it was largely believed the Earth was around 3.3 billion years old. Patterson generously shared credit for the work with his colleagues.

== Tracing geochemical evolution of Earth ==
Patterson's ability to isolate quantities of lead at microgram levels from ordinary rocks and to determine their isotopic compositions enabled him to analyse for lead in sediment samples of the Atlantic and Pacific oceans. Deriving comparative bases from the different ages during which landmasses had drained into the oceans, he showed that the impact of anthropogenic lead being dispersed into the environment was more than 100 times the amount of lead leached naturally into the ocean by surface streams. To Patterson, the Earth's geochemical cycle for lead appeared to be badly out of balance.

To work around the limitations of then-available analytic procedures, Patterson developed new approaches. He found that in comparing similar metals, such as barium, surface ocean waters contained up to 20 times more lead than deep ocean waters. Such evidence caused him to doubt the commonly held view that anthropogenic activities had increased lead concentrations only by a factor of (about) two over naturally occurring levels.

Patterson returned to the problem of his initial experiments and the contamination he had found in the blanks used for sampling. He determined—by analysing ice-core samples from Camp Century in Greenland taken in 1964 and from Antarctica in 1965—that atmospheric lead levels had begun to increase steadily and dangerously soon after tetraethyl lead (TEL) was introduced after being developed to reduce engine knock in internal combustion engines. Patterson then identified 'leaded' engine fuels and the several other uses of lead in manufacturing as the cause of the contamination of his samples. Aware of the significant public-health implications of his findings, he devoted the rest of his life to eliminating lead from being introduced into the environment.

== Campaign against lead poisoning ==
In 1965 Patterson published his paper Contaminated and Natural Lead Environments of Man, beginning his efforts to draw public attention to the problem of increasing lead levels in the environment including the food chain. He criticized the experimental methods of other scientists and thus encountered strong opposition from those then recognized as experts, including Robert A. Kehoe, a noted scientist and strong proponent of the lead producing manufacturers.

In his campaign to have lead removed from gasoline (petrol), Patterson took on the lobbying power of the Ethyl Corporation (which employed Kehoe), and the legacy of the late Thomas Midgley Jr. (who invented tetraethyllead (TEL) and chlorofluorocarbons), as well as the additive-lead industry as a whole. Following his criticism of the lead industry, he was refused contracts by several supposedly-neutral research organizations, including the United States Public Health Service. In 1971 he was excluded from a National Research Council (NRC) panel on atmospheric lead contamination, even though he was by then the foremost singular expert on the subject.

Following Kehoe's arguments, observed levels of lead in blood, soil, or air were broadly referred to as "normal", meaning values near the average; it was assumed that because these levels were common, they were harmless. "Normal" also carries some of the meaning "natural". Patterson argued that the word "normal" should be replaced with "typical", and that just because a certain level of lead was commonplace, it did not mean it was harmless. "Natural", he insisted, was limited to concentrations of lead that existed before human activity produced significant lead contamination, which of late had occurred broadly—especially after the beginning of the industrial revolution.

In his ultraclean laboratory at Caltech, considered one of the first clean rooms, Patterson measured isotopic ratios in a setting free of the contamination that confounded the findings of Kehoe and others. Where Kehoe measured lead in (claimed) "unexposed" workers in a TEL plant and among Mexican farmers, Patterson studied mummies from before the Iron Age, and tuna raised from pelagic waters. Kehoe claimed, without offering evidence, that humans had adapted to increases of environmental lead. Patterson's precise points were that humans had only recently increased the concentrations of lead, and that the short time span of higher exposure (a few thousand years) was only an instant in the Darwinian time scale—nowhere near the time needed to develop adaptive responses.

Patterson focused his attention and his advanced laboratory techniques on lead contamination in food, for which official testing data also reported marked increases. In one study, he showed an increase in lead levels from 0.3 ng/g to 1400 ng/g—in certain canned fish compared with fresh fish—where the official laboratory had reported an increase from 400 ng/g to 700 ng/g. He compared levels of lead, barium, and calcium in 1600-year-old Peruvian skeletons and showed a 700- to 1200-fold increase in lead levels of modern human bones, with no comparable changes in the barium and calcium levels.

Starting with the 1975 model year, the United States mandated the use of unleaded gasoline to protect catalytic converters in all new cars. However, Patterson's efforts achieved an accelerated phaseout of lead from all standard automotive gasoline—but not all leaded fuels—in the United States by 1986. Leaded automotive gasoline was finally completely banned in the USA on January 1, 1996, although it is still used for aviation, which is currently the largest contributor to human lead exposure. By the late 1990s, lead levels in the blood of Americans were reported to have dropped by up to 80%.

In 1978, Patterson was appointed to a National Research Council panel that acknowledged many of the increases of lead contamination and the need for reductions, but some members argued for more research before recommending action. Patterson expressed his opinions in a 78-page minority report, which argued that control measures in certain sensitive sectors—including all leaded fuels, public water distribution systems, food containers, paints and glazes—should start immediately.

== Death ==
Patterson died in his home in Sea Ranch, California, at the age of 73 on December 5, 1995.

== Awards and honors ==
- J. Lawrence Smith Medal, 1973 (National Academy of Sciences)
- V. M. Goldschmidt Award, 1980 (Geochemical Society)
- Tyler Prize for Environmental Achievement, 1995 (University of Southern California)
- Minor planet 2511 Patterson is named in his honor.

=== Memorials ===
- Clair C. Patterson Award, awarded annually since 1998 by the Geochemical Society

== Legacy ==
Patterson was referenced in a 2022 documentary by Derek Muller, The Man Who Accidentally Killed The Most People In History. Patterson was also featured in "The Clean Room," the seventh episode of the American documentary television series Cosmos: A Spacetime Odyssey.

== Further reading (and listening) ==
- Patterson, C.; Chow, T. J. (1962). "The occurrence and significance of lead isotopes in pelagic sediments". Geochimica et Cosmochimica Acta. 26 (2): 263–308. Bibcode:1962GeCoA..26..263C. doi:10.1016/0016-7037(62)90016-9.
- Patterson, C. (1965). "Contaminated and natural lead environments of man". Arch. Environ. Health. 11 (3): 344–360. doi:10.1080/00039896.1965.10664229. PMID 14334042.
- Bryson, Bill (2004). A Short History of Nearly Everything. Broadway. pp. 149, 156–160. ISBN 978-0-7679-0818-4.
- Casanova, I. (1998). "Clair C. Patterson (1922-1995), discoverer of the age of the Earth". Int. Microbiol. Vol. 1, no. 3 (published September 1998). pp. 231–2. PMID 10943366.
- Davidson, Cliff I., ed. (1998). Clean Hands: Clair Patterson's Crusade against Environmental Lead Contamination. New York: Nova Science Publishers. pp. xxxiv+162. ISBN 978-1-56072-568-8.
- Denworth, Lydia Toxic Truth: A Scientist, A Doctor, and the Battle over Lead, Beacon Press, 2009.
- DiMeo, Nate (April 11, 2022). "Small Sample". The Memory Palace (Podcast). No. 192.
- Flegal, A. (1998). "Clair Patterson's Influence on Environmental Research". Environ. Res. Vol. 78, no. 2 (published August 1998). pp. 65–185. Bibcode:1998ER.....78...65F. PMID 9719609.
- Flegal, A. R. (1998). "Clair Patterson's influence on environmental research". Environ. Res. Vol. 78, no. 2 (published August 1998). pp. 64–70. Bibcode:1998ER.....78...65F. doi:10.1006/enrs.1998.3861. PMID 9725987.
- McGrayne, S. Bertsch (2002). "Ch. 9: Lead-Free Gasoline and Clair C. Patterson". Prometheans in the Lab. New York: McGraw-Hill. ISBN 978-0-07-140795-3.
- Needleman, H. L. (1998). "Clair Patterson and Robert Kehoe: two views of lead toxicity". Environ. Res. Vol. 78, no. 2 (published August 1998). pp. 79–85. Bibcode:1998ER.....78...79N. doi:10.1006/enrs.1997.3807. PMID 9719611.
- Nriagu, J. O. (1998). "Clair Patterson and Robert Kehoe's paradigm of "show me the data" on environmental lead poisoning". Environ. Res. Vol. 78, no. 2 (published August 1998). pp. 71–8. Bibcode:1998ER.....78...71N. doi:10.1006/enrs.1997.3808. PMID 9719610.
- Reilly, Lucas (May 17, 2017). "The Most Important Scientist You've Never Heard Of". Mental Floss.
- Rebelsky, Samuel A., "Grinnellians you should know (or know about): Clair Patterson '43", SamR's Assorted Musings and Rants, retrieved October 9, 2022
