= 4th State Objects Protection Regiment (Ukraine) =

4th Pavlohrad Special State Objects Guard Regiment
- 4-й полк охорони особливо важливих державних об'єктів (Ukrainian)
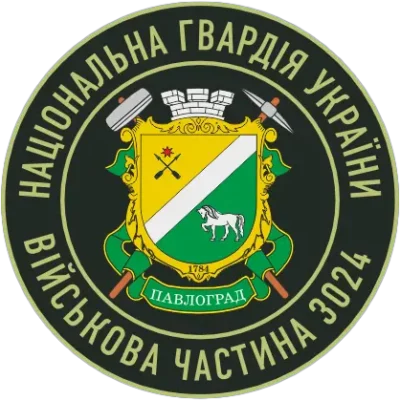
- Regimental Insignia
- Founded: 1991
- Country: Ukraine
- Allegiance: Ministry of Internal Affairs
- Branch: National Guard of Ukraine
- Type: Regiment
- Role: Protection of Strategic Sites
- Part of: National Guard of Ukraine
- Garrison/HQ: Pavlohrad, Dnipropetrovsk Oblast
- Nickname: Pavlohrad
- Engagements: Russo-Ukrainian war: War in Donbas; Siege of Sloviansk; Full scale invasion 2022
- Decorations: For Courage and Bravery

Commanders
- Current commander: Colonel Dmytro Trotsenko

The 4th Pavlohrad Regiment for the protection of important State Objects is a regiment of the National Guard of Ukraine tasked with the protection of important strategic sites. It was established in 1991 and is headquartered in Pavlograd. Pavlograd Mechanical Plant, Pavlograd Chemical Plant and Kharkiv Institute of Physics and Technology amongst other strategic sites are under the regiment's protection.

== History ==
It was established on 14 July 1948 on the basis of the 290th Motorized Rifle Regiment of the Soviet Armed Forces as the 7th Regiment under direct supreme command. The regiment was established in Irpin near Kyiv but on 2 October 1948, it was relocated to the city of Dniprodzerzhinsk, where it took over the protection of military industry facilities in the Dnipropetrovsk Oblast. In 1962, the regiment was transferred to Pavlograd and guarded the Chemical Industry, in 1964, the Plant No. 586, the modern state-owned enterprises of the Pavlograd Chemical Plant and Pavlograd Mechanical Plant was taken under its protection. On 28 November 1968, the 347th regiment was established on the basis of the 33rd detachment of the Internal Troops of Ukraine. In 1990, the regiment was awarded the transitional Red Banner of the Internal Troops of the Soviet Union for the Ukrainian SSR and Moldavian SSR. On 30 September 1991, the regiment became part of the Internal Troops of Ukraine becoming the 4th Separate Regiment. On 14 July 1998, the regiment was presented with a Combat Flag, becoming one of the first units of the Internal Troops of Ukraine to receive one.

In 2014, the regiment became a part of the National Guard of Ukraine and saw combat during the War in Donbass. It took part in the Siege of Sloviansk and on 29 May 2014, during the siege, after unloading food at the 4th checkpoint and replenishing personnel, near Mount Karachun, a Mi-8 MT helicopter of the National Guard of Ukraine was shot down by separatists using a MANPAD killing 12 personnel including two crew members, Major General Serhii Kulchytskyi, six Berkut personnel and an officer of the regiment (Major Vitaly Ivanovich Kurylovych). On 13 March 2015, a soldier of the regiment (Svistunov Vadim Mykolayovych) was killed while on duty at a checkpoint in Donetsk Oblast.

During the Russian invasion of Ukraine, the regiment saw combat. In 2022, the Kharkiv Institute of Physics and Technology, protected by the regiment, was damaged by Russian shelling, resulting in heavy damage to the Neutron Source nuclear facility. In September 2022, the regiment took part in the process of decommunisation by carrying out the removal of Stalinist monuments. On 30 April 2023, as a result of intensive Russian air assault on Pavlograd, a soldier of the regiment (Bohdan Mazuga) was killed in action. On 18 December 2023, the canine unit of the regiment intercepted an illegal shipment of 400 rounds of ammunition, M67 Grenades, a hand-held grenade launcher and an RPG-7. On 6 June 2024, another illegal arms shipment was intercepted by the regiment's canine unit capturing F-1 grenades and around 500 rounds of ammunition.

On 23 February 2026 the unit was awarded the Presidential Award For Courage and Bravery by the President of Ukraine Volodymyr Zelenskyy.

== Structure ==
The structure of the regiment is as follows:

- 4th State Objects Protection Regiment
  - Management and Headquarters
  - 1st Rifle Battalion
  - 2nd Rifle Battalion
  - 3rd Rifle Battalion
  - Reserve Rifle Company
  - Combat and Logistical Support Company
  - RHCBZ Company
  - Special Purpose Platoon
    - Hobby Group
    - Artillery Support Group
    - Armored Vehicle Group
    - Robotic Intelligence Complexes Department
    - Orchestra

== Commanders ==
- Colonel Vitaly Stavenko (2017)
- Colonel Denys Shlega (2018–2021)
- Colonel Dmytro Trotsenko (15 April 2021-)

== Sources ==
- г Павлоград в ч 3024
- Духовий оркестр військової частини 3024 Нацгвардії України
- Військова частина No. 3024 отримала подарунок
- День основания воинской части 3024 в Павлограде
