= Uragan-2M =

- Device type: Stellarator
- Location: Kharkiv, Ukraine
- Affiliation: Kharkiv Institute of Physics and Technology

Technical specifications
- Major radius: 170 cm (67 in)
- Minor radius: 24 cm (9.4 in)
- Magnetic field: <2.4 T (24,000 G)

History
- Preceded by: Saturn-1

Uragan-2M (U-2M, Ukrainian: Ураган-2М) is a stellarator (magnetic plasma confinement, controlled thermonuclear fusion experiment) installed at the Institute of Plasma Physics National Science Center, which is part of the Kharkiv Institute of Physics and Technology (IFS KIPT) in Kharkiv, Ukraine. It was the largest stellarator (torsatron) in Europe until the construction of Wendelstein 7-X.

Uragan-2M was under construction in 1990 and reported its first results in 1993.

== Specifications ==
Uragan-2M is a medium-sized stellarator with reduced helical corrugations. The unit has a torus radius of 170 cm (67 inches), a plasma radius of up to 24 cm (9.4 inches), and a toroidal magnetic field of up to 2.4 teslas (24,000 G).

== See also ==
- Controlled thermonuclear fusion
