= Metallic microlattice =

Ultra-light metallic material

A block of metallic microlattice being supported by a dandelion seed head.

A metallic microlattice is a synthetic porous metallic material consisting of an ultra-light metal foam. With a density as low as 0.99 mg/cm^{3} (0.00561 lb/ft^{3}), it is one of the lightest structural materials known to science. It was developed by a team of scientists from California-based HRL Laboratories, in collaboration with researchers at University of California, Irvine and Caltech, and was first announced in November 2011. The prototype samples were made from a nickel-phosphorus alloy. In 2012, the microlattice prototype was declared one of 10 World-Changing Innovations by Popular Mechanics. Metallic microlattice technology has numerous potential applications in automotive and aeronautical engineering. A detailed comparative review study among other types of metallic lattice structures showed them to be beneficial for light-weighting purposes but expensive to manufacture.

== Synthesis ==
To produce their metallic microlattice, the HRL/UCI/Caltech team first prepared a polymer template using a technique based on self-propagating waveguide formation, though it was noted that other methods can be used to fabricate the template. The process passed UV light through a perforated mask into a reservoir of UV-curable resin. Fiber-optic-like "self-trapping" of the light occurred as the resin cured under each hole in the mask, forming a thin polymer fiber along the path of the light. By using multiple light beams, multiple fibers could then interconnect to form a lattice.

The process was similar to photolithography in that it used a two-dimensional mask to define the starting template structure, but differed in the rate of formation: where stereolithography might take hours to make a full structure, the self-forming waveguide process allowed templates to be formed in 10–100 seconds. In this way, the process enables large free-standing 3D lattice materials to be formed quickly and scalably. The template was then coated with a thin layer of metal by electroless nickel plating, and the template is etched away, leaving a free-standing, periodic porous metallic structure. Nickel was used as the microlattice metal in the original report. Owing to the electrodeposition process, 7% of the material consisted of dissolved phosphorus atoms, and it contained no precipitates.

== Properties ==
A metallic microlattice is composed of a network of interconnecting hollow struts. In the least-dense microlattice sample reported, each strut is about 100 micrometres in diameter, with a wall 100 nanometres thick. The completed structure is about 99.99% air by volume, and by convention, the mass of air is excluded when the microlattice density is calculated. Allowing for the mass of the interstitial air, the true density of the structure is approximately 2.1 mg/cm^{3} (2.1 kg/m^{3}), which is only about 1.76 times the density of air itself at 25 °C. The material is described as being 100 times lighter than Styrofoam. Microlattices can also be 100 times stronger than regular polymers.

Metallic microlattices are characterized by very low densities, with the 2011 record of 0.9 mg/cm^{3} being among the lowest values of any known solid. The previous record of 1.0 mg/cm^{3} was held by silica aerogels, and aerographite is claimed to have a density of 0.2 mg/cm^{3}. Mechanically, these microlattices are behaviorally similar to elastomers and almost completely recover their shape after significant compression. This gives them a significant advantage over earlier aerogels, which are brittle, glass-like substances. This elastomeric property in metallic microlattices furthermore results in efficient shock absorption. Their Young's modulus E exhibits different scaling, with the density ρ, E ~ ρ^{2}, compared to E ~ ρ^{3} in aerogels and carbon nanotube foams.

== Applications ==
Metallic microlattice may find potential applications in thermal and vibration insulators such as shock absorbers, and may also prove useful as battery electrodes and catalyst supports. Additionally, the microlattices' ability to return to their original state after being compressed may make them suitable for use in spring-like energy storage devices. Automotive and aeronautical manufacturers are using microlattice technology to develop extremely lightweight and efficient structures that combine multiple functions, such as structural reinforcement and heat transfer, into single components for high-performance vehicles.

== Similar materials ==
A similar but denser material, consisting of an electrodeposited nanocrystalline nickel layer over a polymeric rapid-prototyped truss, was created by researchers at the University of Toronto in 2008. In 2012, German researchers created a carbon foam known as aerographite, with an even lower density than a metallic microlattice. In 2013, Chinese scientists developed a carbon-based aerogel which was claimed to be lighter still.

Nanolattices like tube-based nanostructures are similar structures on a smaller scale.
