= Nanolattice =

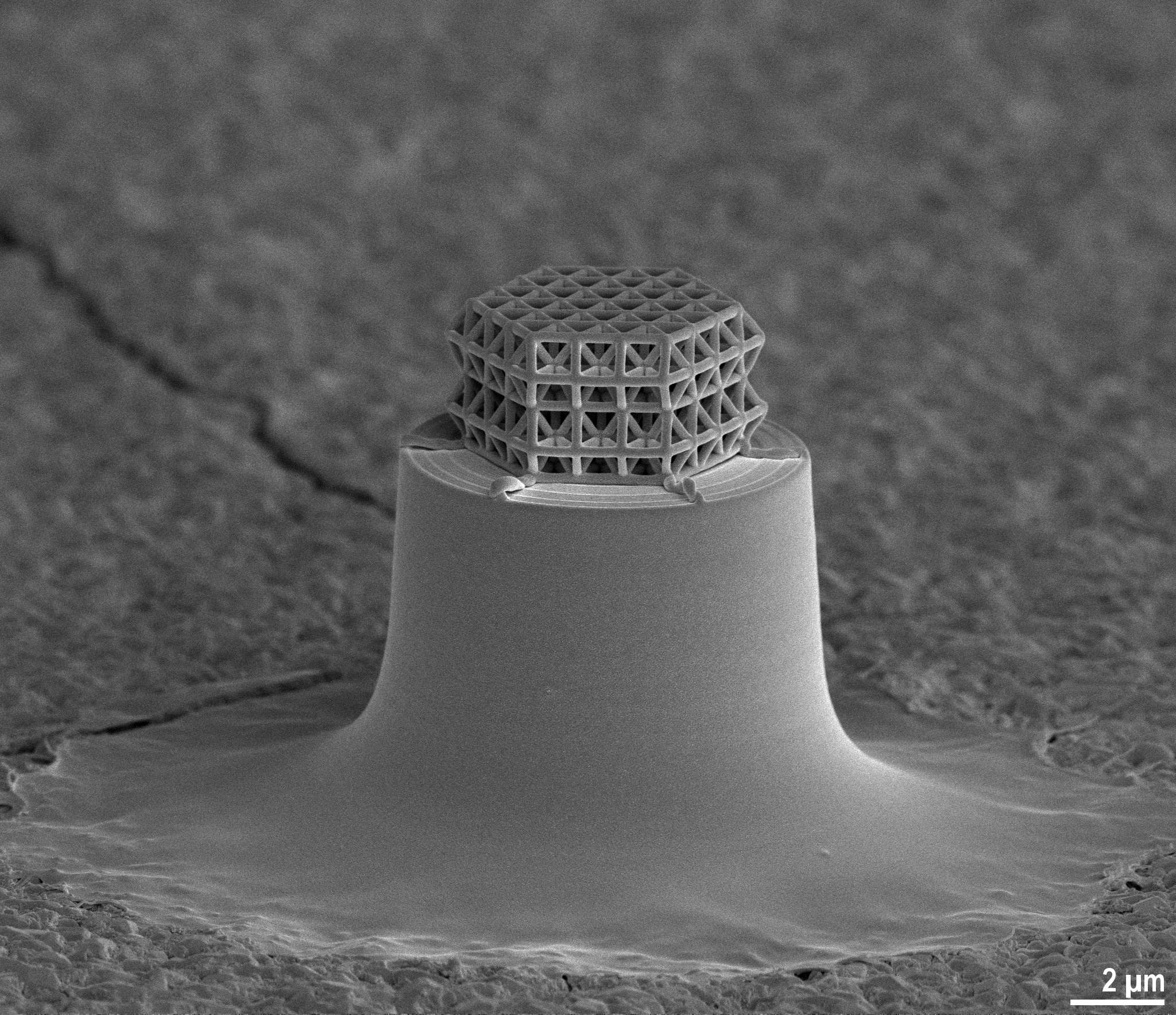
Scanning electron micrograph of an ultra-strong yet lightweight 3D printed carbon nanolattice.

A nanolattice is a synthetic porous material consisting of nanometer-size members patterned into an ordered lattice structure, like a space frame. The nanolattice is a material class that emerged after 2015. Nanolattices redefine the limits of the material property space. Despite consisting of 50-99% air, nanolattices are mechanically robust because they take advantage of size-dependent properties generally seen in nanoparticles, nanowires, and thin films. The most typical mechanical properties of nanolattices include strength, damage tolerance, and stiffness. Thus, nanolattices have a wide range of potential applications.

== History ==
Driven by the evolution of 3D printing techniques, nanolattices aiming to exploit beneficial material size effects through miniaturized lattice designs were first developed in the mid-2010s,. Nanolattices are the smallest man-made lattice truss structures and a class of metamaterials that derive their properties from both their geometry (general metamaterial definition) and their elements' small size. Therefore, they can possess effective properties not found in nature, and that may not be achieved with larger-scale lattices.

== Synthesis ==
Polymer templates are manufactured by 3D printing processes, such as multiphoton lithography, self-assembly, self-propagating photopolymer waveguides, and direct laser writing techniques. Those methods can produce a unit cell size on the order of 50 nanometers. Genetic engineering also has potential in synthesizing nanolattice. Ceramic, metal or composite material nanolattices are formed by post-treatment of the polymer templates with techniques including pyrolysis, atomic layer deposition, electroplating and electroless plating. Pyrolysis, can additionally shrink lattices by up to 90%, creating the smallest structures, whereby the polymeric template material transforms into carbon, or other ceramics and metals, through thermal decomposition in inert atmosphere or vacuum.

== Properties ==
At the nanoscale, size effects and different dimensional constraints, like grain boundaries, dislocations, and distribution of voids, can change material properties. Nanolattices possess unparalleled mechanical properties. Nanolattices are the strongest existing cellular materials despite their light weight. Though 50%-99% air, nanolattice can be as strong as steel. Its effective strength can reach up to 1 GPa. On the order of 50nm, the volume of individual elements, such as walls, nodes, and trusses, thereby statistically nearly eliminate the material flaw population. The base material of nanolattices can reach mechanical strengths on the order of the theoretical strength of an ideal, perfect crystal. While such effects are typically limited to individual, geometrically primitive structures such as nanowires, the specific architecture allows nanolattices to exploit them in complex, three-dimensional structures of notably larger overall size. Nanolattices can be designed to be highly deformable and recoverable, even with ceramic base materials. Nanolattices are able to undergo 80% compressive strain without catastrophic failure and then still recover to 100% original shape. Nanolattices can possess mechanical metamaterial properties like auxetic (negative Poisson's ratio) or meta-fluidic behavior (large bulk modulus). Nanolattices can combine mechanical resilience and ultra-low thermal conductivity and can have electromagnetic metamaterial characteristics such as optical cloaking. However, one challenge in nanolattice research is how to retain the robust properties while increasing object size. It is challenging to keep nanoscale size effects in bulk structure. The straightforward workaround to overcome this challenge is to combine bulk processes with thin film deposition techniques to retain the frame space hollow structure.

== Applications ==
The first market for nanolattices may be small-scale, small-lot components for biomedical, electrochemical, microfluidic, and aerospace applications, which require customizable property combinations. In the aerospace industry, nanolattices could make aircraft lighter and save energy.

== See also ==
- Metamaterials
- Nanomaterials
- Microlattice
