= Kyrylo Synelnykov =

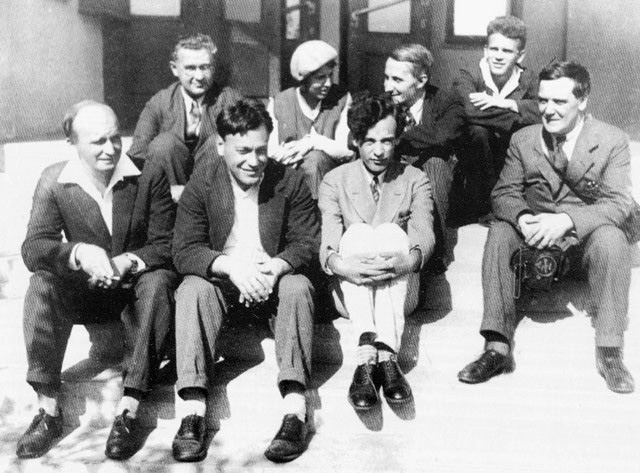
- Synelnykov (2nd row, 3rd from left) in 1934 at the Kharkiv Institute of Physics and Technology
- Born: Kyrylo Dmytrovych Synelnykov; 29 May 1901; Pavlohrad, Yekaterinoslav Governorate, Russian Empire
- Died: 16 October 1966 (aged 65); Kharkiv, Ukrainian SSR, Soviet Union
- Education: M. V. Frunze Crimean University
- Scientific career
- Academic advisors: Abram Ioffe

Kyrylo Dmytrovych Synelnykov (Ukrainian: Кирило Дмитрович Синельников; 29 May 1901 – 16 October 1966) was a Soviet and Ukrainian physicist who participated in the Soviet atomic bomb project.

== Biography ==
Synelnykov was born in Pavlohrad.

In January 1921, he was accepted into the M. V. Frunze Crimean University, and graduated two years later.

In 1956 he created a center for research into the stellarator device type for fusion energy production at the Kharkiv Institute of Physics and Technology with the support of Igor Kurchatov. He oversaw the construction and operation of the world's first torsatron-type stellarator, Saturn-1. He also oversaw a plan to build a large stellarator reactor, instituted by Kurchatov, that however did not materialize. He did oversee smaller torsatrons at the Institute.

== Awards and honors ==
- Three Orders of Lenin
- Three Orders of the Red Banner of Labour
- Honored Science and Technology Figure of the Ukrainian SSR

The Synelnykov Prize for outstanding works in the field of physics is named after him.
