= Charlotte Riefenstahl =

German physicist (1899–1993)

Charlotte Houtermans (née Riefenstahl; 24 May 1899 in Bielefeld, Germany – 6 January 1993 in Northfield, Minnesota, United States) was a German physicist.

== Education ==
Riefenstahl began her studies at the Georg-August University of Göttingen in 1922, where her teachers included, among others, Max Born, Richard Courant, James Franck, David Hilbert, Emmy Noether, Robert Pohl, and Carl Runge. She received her doctorate under Gustav Heinrich Tammann in 1927, the same year as Robert Oppenheimer, under Born, and Fritz Houtermans, under Franck. She was courted by both Oppenheimer and Houtermans.

== Career ==
Riefenstahl taught and was a research assistant at Vassar College, later at Winthrop College.

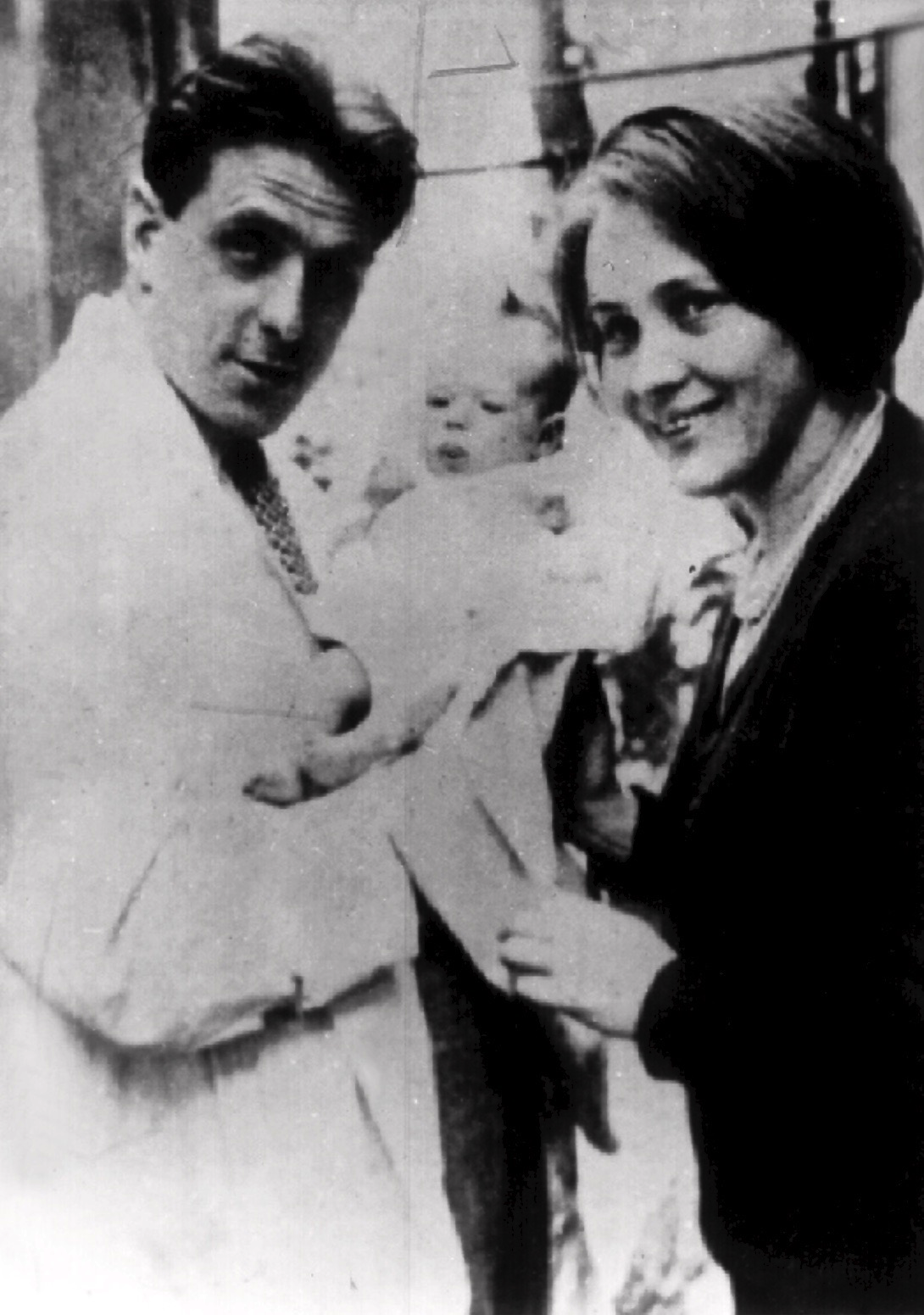
Charlotte Houtermans with her daughter Giovanna and husband Fritz Houtermans, Berlin 1933

In 1930, Riefenstahl left Vassar and went back to Germany. During a physics conference at the Black Sea resort of Batumi, Riefenstahl and Houtermans were married in August 1930, with Wolfgang Pauli and Rudolf Peierls as witnesses to the ceremony. (Three other references cite the year as being 1931.)

After Adolf Hitler came to power in 1933, Charlotte Houtermans insisted that they leave Germany. They went to Great Britain, near Cambridge. Max von Laue was the last to send them off, as he entrusted Charlotte with messages for friends abroad. In 1935, Charlotte and Fritz left England for the Soviet Union, as Fritz accepted a job in Khar’kov. In 1937, he was arrested by the NKVD and imprisoned. Charlotte managed to escape to Denmark and eventually went back to England and then on to the United States.

From 1940 she taught at Wellesley College.

Charlotte was the first and third wife to Fritz Houtermans in four marriages. They were divorced in 1943, due to a new law in Germany and enforced wartime separation. They were again married in August 1953, with Pauli again standing as a witness; the marriage ended after only a few months. They had two children during their first marriage, Giovanna and Jan.

== Literature ==
- Monica Healea and Charlotte Houtermans The Relative Secondary Electron Emission Due to He, Ne, and A Ions Bombarding a Hot Nickel Target, Phys. Rev. Volume 58, Number 7, pp. 608–610 (1940). The authors are identified as being at Vassar College, Poughkeepsie, New York. Houtermans is identified as a research assistant in physics. The article was received 17 June 1940.
- Monica Healea and Charlotte Houtermans The Effect of Temperature on the Secondary Electron Emission from Nickel, Phys. Rev. Volume 60, Number 2, 154–154 (1941). The authors are identified as being at Vassar College, Poughkeepsie, New York. The article was received 20 June 1941.

== Books ==
- Gregor Wentzel, translated by Charlotte Houtermans and J. M. Jauch, with an Appendix by J. M. Jauch, Quantum Theory of Fields (Interscience, 1949) (Dover, 2003)

== Bibliography ==
- Bird, Kai and Martin J. Sherwin American Prometheus: The Triumph and Tragedy of J. Robert Oppenheimer (Vintage, 2005)
- Hentschel, Ann M. The Physical Tourist: Peripatetic Highlights in Bern, Physics in Perspective Volume 7, Number 1, 107–129 (2005). The author is cited as being at the Wissenschaftstheorie und Wissenschaftsgeschichte, University of Bern, Uni-Tobler, Länggassstrasse 49a, CH-3012 Bern 9, Switzerland.
- Hentschel, Klaus (editor) and Ann M. Hentschel (editorial assistant and translator) Physics and National Socialism: An Anthology of Primary Sources (Birkhäuser, 1996) ISBN 0-8176-5312-0
- Khriplovich, Iosif B. The Eventful Life of Fritz Houtermans, Physics Today Volume 45, Issue 7, 29 – 37 (1992)
- Landrock, Konrad Friedrich Georg Houtermans (1903–1966) – Ein bedeutender Physiker des 20. Jahrhunderts, Naturwissenschaftliche Rundschau Volume 56, Number 4, 187 – 199 (2003)
- Powers, Thomas Heisenberg’s War: The Secret History of the German Bomb (Knopf, 1993) ISBN 0-394-51411-4
