= Edward D. Goldberg =

American biochemist (1921–2008)

Edward David Goldberg
- Born: August 2, 1921; Sacramento, California, United States
- Died: March 7, 2008 (aged 86); Encinitas, California, United States
- Education: University of Chicago
- Awards: Tyler Prize for Environmental Achievement (1989)
- Scientific career
- Fields: marine chemist
- Workplaces: Scripps Institution of Oceanography
- Doctoral advisor: Harrison Brown

Edward David Goldberg (August 2, 1921 – March 7, 2008) was a marine chemist, known for his studies of pollution in the oceans.

== Biography ==
Goldberg was born on August 2, 1921, in Sacramento, California. He received his B.S. in chemistry from the University of California, Berkeley in 1942, and then, after serving in the Navy during World War II, did his graduate studies under the supervision of Harrison Brown at the University of Chicago, where he received his Ph.D. in chemistry in 1949. For the rest of his life, he worked as a professor of chemistry at the Scripps Institution of Oceanography at the University of California, San Diego. He died March 7, 2008, in Encinitas, California.

The director of Scripps, Tony Haymet, wrote about him that

Ed Goldberg earned the reputation not only as an extraordinary marine chemist, but also as an engaging professor who truly inspired his students. He was always willing to tackle the tough issues facing the marine environment and our harbors and seas are better off due to Ed's enduring dedication and commitment.

== Research ==
Goldberg wrote more than 225 research papers and a number of books, largely concerning ocean geochemistry, marine life in coastal waters, and man's impact on the ocean.

One of Goldberg's earliest studies on ocean pollution concerned sewage in Santa Monica Bay. Goldberg warned of pollution's risk to all ocean life at the 1969 American Geophysical Union conference.

Will it alter the ocean as a resource? Will we lose the ocean?

— Edward Goldberg

Later, in the 1970s, Goldberg began the EPA-funded Mussel Watch program, which measured ocean pollution by its effects on shellfish. His studies led him to push for a ban on tributyltin, a chemical that was used in ship paint for its toxic effects on barnacles but that was poisoning the mussels in San Diego Bay. Goldberg also published highly cited works on colloids in ocean water and on pollution from fossil fuel consumption.

A significant innovation in Goldberg's research was the suggestion, implemented in Mussel Watch and now commonplace in marine chemistry, of using mussels to measure pollutant levels. For instance, Mills writes, "Measurements of metals by direct chemical analysis in water and sediment are limited in reliability. Consequently, after the initial suggestion by Goldberg (1975), many studies have utilised mussels to assess metals in the environment. Mussels have been suggested to be the ideal bioindicator organism in biomonitoring studies due to their sessile filter-feeding life style, coupled with their abilities to accumulate metals to much higher concentrations than those found in water and to not metabolise metals appreciably."

== Awards and honors ==
In 1984 he won the first Bostwick H. Ketchum Award, given by the Woods Hole Oceanographic Institution, both for his leadership in environmental quality research and for his efforts to translate that research into policy. In 1989 he won the Tyler Prize for Environmental Achievement for his work on marine pollution, and the Roger Revelle Award of the San Diego Oceans Foundation. In 1999, the American Society of Limnology and Oceanography gave Goldberg the first Ruth Patrick Award for Environmental Problem Solving in the Aquatic Sciences. Goldberg was also a Fellow of the Meteoritical Society and a member of the American Association for the Advancement of Science and of the United States National Academy of Sciences.
