= Korets–Landau leaflet =

Condemnation of Joseph Stalin and the NDK

The Korets–Landau leaflet, authored by the Soviet physicists Moisey Korets and Lev Landau in 1938, condemned the Soviet leader Joseph Stalin and the NKVD in response to the Great Purge in the Soviet Union.

Stalin was accused of betrayal of the October Revolution, and the sociopolitical work of his regime, especially the secret police NKVD, was compared with that under German Nazi leader Adolf Hitler and the Italian Fascism leader Benito Mussolini, who at this time were in active political struggle against Communism in their countries; both were ideological and political enemies of the Soviet Union. In opposing Stalinism, the leaflet had made use of purely socialist ideas. In particular, it had used for its title the communist ideological slogan "Workers of the world, unite" borrowed from The Communist Manifesto.

Creation of the leaflet was greatly motivated by the UPTI affair, which resulted in imprisonments and executions of a number of leading Soviet scientists. Its propagation was planned on the International Workers' Day 1 May 1938, but this was thwarted when it was discovered by the NKVD, which arrested the authors. The investigation showed that the leaflet was compiled by Korets and edited by Landau. Together with Landau and Korets, the Soviet physicist Yuri Rumer was also arrested. Landau was released thanks to Pyotr Kapitsa's support, but both Korets and Rumer were imprisoned in Gulag labor camps.
