= Fritz Houtermans =

Prussian-born physicist and communist (1903–1966)

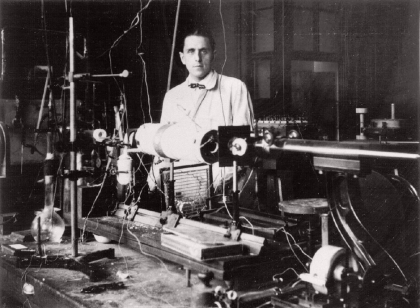
- Born: 22 January 1903; Gdańsk
- Died: 1 March 1966; Bern
- Occupations: Physicist; university teacher
- Academic career
- Fields: Physics, nuclear physics, geochemistry, astrochemistry
- Institutions: Kharkiv Institute of Physics and Technology (1935–1937)
- Doctoral advisor: James Franck

Friedrich Georg "Fritz" Houtermans (January 22, 1903 – March 1, 1966) was a Dutch-Austrian-German atomic and nuclear physicist and Communist born in Zoppot (now Sopot) near Danzig (now Gdańsk), West Prussia to a Dutch father, who was a wealthy banker. He was brought up in Vienna, where he was educated, and moved to Göttingen when he was 18 to study. It was in Göttingen where he obtained his Ph.D. under James Franck. With Robert d'Escourt Atkinson, he made the first estimates of the rate of stellar nuclear fusion.

== Education ==
Houtermans began his studies at the University of Göttingen in 1921, and he received his doctorate under James Franck in 1927, the same year Robert Oppenheimer received his doctorate under Max Born. He completed his Habilitation under Gustav Hertz at Technische Universität Berlin, in 1932. Hertz and Franck were Nobel laureates; they shared the 1925 Nobel Prize in Physics.

While at Göttingen, Houtermans met Enrico Fermi, George Gamow, Werner Heisenberg, Wolfgang Pauli, and Victor Frederick Weisskopf. Houtermans and Gamow did pioneering work on quantum tunneling in 1928. Houtermans, in 1929, with Robert d'Escourt Atkinson, made the first calculation of stellar nuclear fusion reactions. Their pioneering calculations were the impetus for Carl Friedrich von Weizsäcker and Hans Bethe, in 1939, to put forth the correct theory of stellar thermonuclear energy generation.

Houtermans used his discovery to woo Charlotte Riefenstahl:

That evening, after we had finished our paper, I went for a walk with a pretty girl. As soon as it grew dark the stars came out, one after another, in all their splendour. "Don't they shine beautifully?" cried my companion. But I simply stuck out my chest and said proudly: "I've known since yesterday why it is that they shine."

Riefenstahl, who received her doctorate in physics at the University of Göttingen in 1927, the same year as Houtermans and Robert Oppenheimer, was courted by both men. (Note: She was no relation to Leni Riefenstahl, the German filmmaker.) In 1930, she left her teaching position at Vassar College and went back to Germany. During a physics conference at the Black Sea resort of Batumi, Riefenstahl and Houtermans were married in August 1930, in Tbilisi, with Wolfgang Pauli and Rudolf Peierls as witnesses to the ceremony. (Note: Three other references cite the year as being 1931.)

== Career ==
From 1932 to 1933, Houtermans taught at Technische Universität Berlin and was an assistant to Hertz. While there, he met Patrick Blackett, Max von Laue, and Leó Szilárd.

Houtermans was a Communist; he had been a member of the German Communist Party since the 1920s. After the election of Adolf Hitler in 1933, Charlotte Houtermans insisted that they leave Germany. They went to Great Britain, near Cambridge, where he worked for the EMI (Electrical and Musical Instruments, Ltd.) Television Laboratory. In 1935 Houtermans emigrated to the Soviet Union, as the result of a proposal by Alexander Weissberg, who had emigrated to there in 1931. Houtermans took an appointment at the Kharkov Physico-Technical Institute and worked there for two years with the Russian physicist Valentin P. Fomin. In the Great Purge, Houtermans was arrested by the NKVD in December 1937. He was tortured and confessed to being a Trotskyist plotter and German spy, out of fear from threats against Charlotte. However, Charlotte had already escaped from the Soviet Union to Denmark, after which she went to England and finally the USA. After the Hitler-Stalin Pact of 1939, Houtermans was turned over to the Gestapo in May 1940 and imprisoned in Berlin. Through efforts of Max von Laue, Houtermans was released in August 1940, whereupon he became employed Forschungslaboratorium für Elektronenphysik, a private laboratory of Manfred Baron von Ardenne, in Lichterfelde, a suburb of Berlin. In 1944, Houtermans took a position as a nuclear physicist at the Physikalisch-Technische Reichsanstalt.

While imprisoned in the Soviet Union, a cellmate of Houtermans was the Kiev University historian Konstantin Shteppa. They would later write a book together, Russian Purge and the Extraction of Confession, under the pseudonyms of Beck and Godin to protect their many friends and colleagues back in the USSR.

At the Forschunsinstitut Manfred von Ardenne, Houtermans showed that transuranic isotopes, such as neptunium and plutonium, could be used as fissionable fuels in substitution for uranium. In an act of espionage against his country, Houtermans sent a telegram from Switzerland to Eugene Wigner at the Met Lab warning the USA's Manhattan Project of German work on fission: "Hurry up. We are on the track."

During Houtermans's employment at the Physikalisch-Technische Reichsanstalt (PTR), he got himself into serious trouble as a result of his habit of being a chain-smoker and suffering great distress if he did not have a supply of tobacco. On official PTR stationery, he wrote to a Dresden cigarette manufacturer to obtain a kilogram of Macedonian tobacco, claiming that he could extract heavy water from the tobacco, and thus that it was "kriegswichtig", i.e., important for the war effort. When he had smoked the tobacco, he again wrote for more, however, the letter fell into the hands of an official at the PTR, who had him fired. Werner Heisenberg and Carl Weizsäcker came to the rescue of Houtermans and arranged an interview for him with Walter Gerlach, the plenipotentiary (Bevollmächtiger) for German nuclear research under the Reich Research Council. As a result, Houtermans moved to Göttingen in 1945, where Hans Kopferman and Richard Becker got him positions at the Institut für Theoretische Physik and II. Physikalisches Institut der Universität Göttingen.

From 1952, Houtermans took a position as ordinarius professor of physics at the University of Bern. During his tenure there, he founded Berner Schule, whose thrust was the application of radioactivity to astrophysics, cosmochemistry, and geosciences.

== Personal ==
Houtermans was married four times. Charlotte was his first and third wife in four marriages. They had two children, a daughter Giovanna (born in Berlin, 1932) and a son Jan (born in Kharkov, 1935), and they were divorced the first time in 1943, due to a new law in Germany and enforced wartime separation. In February 1944, Houtermans married Ilse Bartz, a chemical engineer; they worked together during the war and published a paper. Houtermans and Ilse had three children, Pieter, Elsa, and Cornelia. In August 1953, again with Pauli standing as a witness, Charlotte and Houtermans were again married, but they divorced again in only a few months. In 1955, Houtermans married Lore Müller, sister of his stepbrother, Hans. She brought her four-year-old daughter to the marriage, and she and Houtermans had a son, Hendrik, born in 1956.

Houtermans died of lung cancer on 1 March 1966.

== Internal report ==
Houtermans authored a report which was published in Kernphysikalische Forschungsberichte (Research Reports in Nuclear Physics), an internal publication of the German Uranverein. Reports in this publication were classified Top Secret, they had very limited distribution, and the authors were not allowed to keep copies. The reports were confiscated under the Allied Operation Alsos and sent to the United States Atomic Energy Commission for evaluation. In 1971, the reports were declassified and returned to Germany. The reports are available at the Karlsruhe Nuclear Research Center and the American Institute of Physics.

- Fritz Houtermans Zur Frage der Auslösung von Kern-Kettenreaktionen. G-94.

== Works (selection) ==
- Atkinson, R. and Houtermans, F.G. "Aufbaumöglichkeit in Sternen" (Z. für Physik 54, 656-665, 1929)
- Houtermans, F.G. "Über ein neues Verfahren zur Durchführung chemischer Altersbestimmungen nach der Blei-Methode" (Springer, 1951)
- Houtermans, Fritz "Publikationen von Friedrich Georg Houtermans aus den Jahren 1926-1950" (Zusammengestellt im Physikalischen Institut Universität Bern, 1955)
- Geiss, J. and E. D. Goldberg and F. G. Houtermans "Earth Science and Meteoritics- dedicated to F. G. Houtermans on his sixtieth birthday F.G. Houtermans" (North Holland, 1963)

For a partial list of works by Houtermans, see the Wolfram biography.

== See also ==
- Directed-energy weapon
- Excimer laser
- Stellar nucleosynthesis
- ZETA (fusion reactor)

== Sources ==
- Beck, F.; Godin, W. (1951). Russian Purge and The Extraction of Confession. London: Hurst and Blackett – via Internet Archive.. Houtermans and Konstantine F. Shteppa, the authors of this book, took the pseudonyms Beck and Godin to protect their many friends and colleagues back in the USSR.
- Amaldi, Edoardo (2012). Braccini, Severio; Ereditato, Antonio; Scampoli, Paola (eds.). The Adventurous Life of Friedrich Georg Houtermans, Physicist (1903-1966). SpringerBriefs in Physics. SpringerBriefs in Physics. Bibcode:2012alfg.book.....A. doi:10.1007/978-3-642-32855-8. ISBN 978-3-642-32855-8.
