= George Tilton =

Geochemist (1923–2010)

- Born: June 3, 1923; Danville, IL
- Died: October 12, 2010 (aged 87); Eugene, OR
- Education: University of Chicago
- Known for: U-Pb geochronology
- Scientific career
- Fields: Geochemistry
- Workplaces: University of California Santa Barbara
- Thesis: (1957)

George Tilton (June 3, 1923 – October 12, 2010) was an American geochemist who specialized in uranium-lead geochronology. He was the first to measure a U-Pb date on zircon and was instrumental in developing analytical techniques for the measurement of U, Th, and Pb in minerals and rocks, using isotope dilution and mass spectrometry.

== Biography ==
George Tilton was born in Danville Illinois on June 3, 1923. He enrolled at Blackburn College in Illinois, but his education was interrupted in 1943 when was called to serve in the US Army. He participated in the campaign to liberate France, where he was wounded in November 1944. After the war, in 1947, Tilton completed his B.S. in chemistry from the University of Illinois, including a term paper on "reactions of slow and fast neutrons" and a senior thesis on the use of radioactive tracers to study chemical reactions. He earned his Ph.D. in chemistry at the University of Chicago in 1951, working on clean lab chemistry, isotope dilution and mass spectrometry techniques to measure the uranium content of meteorites. Fellow graduate student Clair Patterson and he achieved two momentous results: the first accurate age of Earth and the Solar System based on Pb isotope ratios, and the ages for terrestrial rocks using U-Pb isotopic dates. He was a researcher at the Carnegie Institution of Washington from 1951-1965, working on U-Pb dating and the use of isotope tracers. In 1965 George accepted the offer of a professorship at the University of California, Santa Barbara. There he mentored many graduate students and researchers until his retirement in 1991. He remained an active emeritus professor there until a few years before his death.

== Awards and honors ==
- Member of the National Academy of Sciences
- Fellow of the Geological Society of America
- Fellow of the American Geophysical Union
- Honorary Doktor der Naturwissenschaften from ETH Zurich

== Selected bibliography ==
- Tilton, GR; Aldrich, LT; Inghram, MG (1954). Mass Spectrometric Determination Of Thorium. Analytical Chemistry v. 26, p. 894-898, doi: 10.1021/Ac60089a026
- Tilton, GR; Patterson, C; Brown, H; et al. (1955). Isotopic Composition And Distribution Of Lead, Uranium, And Thorium In A Precambrian Granite. Geological Society of America Bulletin v. 66, p. 1131-1148, doi: 10.1130/0016-7606(1955)66[1131:Icadol]2.0.Co;2
- Patterson, C; Tilton, G; Inghram, M (1955). Age Of The Earth. Science v. 121, p. 69-75, doi: 10.1126/Science.121.3134.69
- Tilton, GR; Nicolaysen, LO (1957). The Use Of Monazites For Age Determination. Geochimica Et Cosmochimica Acta v. 11, p. 28-40, doi: 10.1016/0016-7037(57)90003-0
- Tilton, GR (1960). Volume Diffusion As A Mechanism For Discordant Lead Ages. Journal of Geophysical Research v. 65, p. 2933-2945, doi: 10.1029/Jz065i009p02933
- Tilton, GR; Hopson, CA; Wright, JE (1981). Uranium-Lead Isotopic Ages Of The Samail Ophiolite, Oman, With Applications To Tethyan Ocean Ridge Tectonics. Journal of Geophysical Research v. 86, p. 2763-2775, doi: 10.1029/Jb086ib04p02763
- Tilton, GR; Schreyer, W; Schertl, HP (1991). Pb-Sr-Nd Isotopic Behavior Of Deeply Subducted Crustal Rocks From The Dora Maira Massif, Western Alps, Italy-What Is The Age Of The Ultrahigh-Pressure Metamorphism. Contributions To Mineralogy And Petrology v. 108, p. 22-33, doi: 10.1007/Bf00307323
- Tilton, GR (1973). Isotopic Lead Ages Of Chondritic Meteorites. Earth And Planetary Science Letters v. 19, p. 321-329, doi: 10.1016/0012-821x(73)90082-4
