= Konstantin Shteppa =

American historian

- Костянтин Теодосійович Штепа
- Born: December 15, 1896; Lokhvytsia, Poltava Governorate, Russian Empire (now Ukraine)
- Died: November 19, 1958 (aged 61); New York City, New York
- Other name: Kost Shtepa
- Occupation: Historian

Konstantin Feodosyevich Shteppa (Note: Ukrainian: Костянтин «Кость» Теодосійович Штепа, romanized: Kostiantyn "Kost" Teodosiiovych Shtepa; Russian: Константин Феодосьевич Штеппа, romanized: Konstantin Feodosyevich Shteppa) (December 15 (O.S. 3), 1896, Lokhvytsia – November 19, 1958, New York City) was a Soviet and American historian of German-Ukrainian descent. He studied history of the Byzantine Empire, the Orthodox Church, late medieval history of Ukraine and the history of Stalin's purges. Originally an NKVD informant, he switched allegiance to the SD, the intelligence agency of the SS and the Gestapo, during World War II. He immigrated to the US after the war, where he taught and worked for Radio Free Europe/Radio Liberty.

== Early years in Ukraine ==
Shteppa was born in Lokhvytsia, nowadays in Poltava Oblast of Ukraine into the family of an Orthodox priest of German descent. He studied at the Poltava Theological Seminary (1910–1914) and at the Faculty of History and Philology of St. Petersburg University under Professor Mykhailo Rostovtsev.

In 1916 Shteppa transferred to a military school, eventually participating in the First World War. During the civil war, he served in the White Army under command of general Pyotr Wrangel. He was arrested in 1919, seriously wounded in 1920, and taken prisoner during the retreat of Wrangel's army near Perekop.

== Academic career ==
After the war, he completed his education at the Nizhyn Institute of Public Education at the Faculty of History and Philology, the course of Professor Ivan Turtsevich. Shteppa was able to conceal his anti-Soviet past, procuring new identity papers and becoming known under the surname Shtepa (with one "p"). In 1927 he defended a Ph.D. thesis and became a professor. In 1930 he moved to Kyiv. He became a prominent Soviet historian, head of the Chair of Antiquity and the Middle Age in Kyiv University, later dean of the historical faculty in the same university, and deputy of the Kyiv City Council. In addition, he worked at the cultural-historical commission of the Department of Oriental Studies at the All-Ukrainian Academy of Sciences. He co-authored with Oleksander Ohloblyn several propaganda articles against "Russian imperial chauvinism and local nationalism".

From 1927 to 1938 he was an NKVD informant. On 18 March 1938, amidst the Great Purge, he was arrested for his alleged anti-Soviet sentiments. While he was in prison, his baby daughter died of hunger. After the dismissal of Nikolay Yezhov from the post of Minister of the Interior, on 28 September 1939, Shteppa was released without explanation and restored to his professor position at the university; Ukrainian historians accuse him of continued cooperation with NKVD.

== Collaboration with the Nazis ==
After the start of the German-Soviet War Shteppa was drafted into the Red Army, but after getting wounded in a German air raid was allowed to return to Kyiv. He refused to evacuate and stayed in the city under German occupation. He shortly worked as head of the education department in the city administration and head of Kyiv University (which was dissolved soon afterwards). On the latter position Shteppa's major concern was the procurement of ration cards for the university staff.

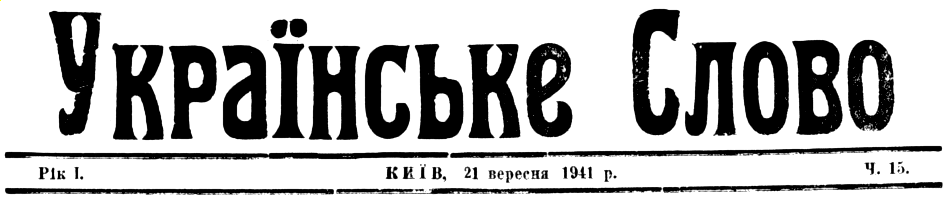
Logo of Ukrainske Slovo (Kyiv 1941), the predecessor to Nove Ukrainske Slovo edited by Shteppa in 1941-1943

Shteppa came into conflict with the mayor of Kyiv, Volodymyr Bahaziy and his supporters, a group of pro-Melnyk Ukrainian nationalists, which resulted in their arrest and execution, as well as suppression of the city newspaper "The Ukrainian Word" (Ukrainske Slovo). As a result, Shteppa was appointed editor-in-chief of the newly created newspaper "The New Ukrainian Word" (Nove Ukrainske Slovo), where he worked in 1941–1943. The newspaper took an openly pro-German stance and criticized the "nationalist" policy of the previous city administration. In 1943 Shteppa also worked as editor-in-chief of the Russian-language weekly Poslednie Novosti.

In September 1943 Shteppa left Kyiv for Germany together with his family. Near Sarny the train carrying the family was caught in an ambush, which killed Shteppa's son-in-law. At the end of the war Shteppa worked in the mass media of General Andrei Vlasov's movement. His son Erasm was conscripted by the Wehrmacht in 1944, was captured by the Soviets, and spent 20 years in prison before he was able to emigrate to Germany.

== Postwar activities in the West ==
Shortly after the war he met Fritz Houtermans, a renowned physicist who had been his cellmate in 1938. The latter provided him and his family permits to stay in Germany. Later they co-authored a book "Russian Purge and the Extraction of Confession", which was published under the pseudonyms of Beck and Godin in order to protect their many friends and colleagues back in the USSR.

Shteppa briefly worked as librarian for Clemens August Graf von Galen after his arrival in Germany. In 1947-1949 he actively collaborated in the magazines "Posev" and "Grani".

In the early 1950s Shteppa himself managed to emigrate with the rest of his family to the US, where he worked for the CIA, taught Russian language and literature at the American Army School (1950–1952), published articles and books on Soviet and Russian history, and worked as a columnist for Radio Svoboda. Along with such scientists as Abdurakhman Avtorkhanov, V. O. Yakovlev (B. Troitskyi), O. P. Filipov, K. G. Krypton, and V. P. Marchenko, he was one of the co-founders and employees of the "Institute for the Study of the History and Culture of the USSR" in Munich (1950).

His role in persecution of Ukrainian nationalists in Kyiv under the German occupation was, however, never forgotten nor forgiven by them. Oleksander Ohloblyn ignored Shteppa in his publications on the modern Ukrainian historiography.

Shteppa died in 1958 at Queens Memorial Hospital in Queens, New York City. Shteppa's daughter Aglaya Gorman (1924–2013) published a book of reminiscences about the family's history.

== Works ==
- Historical Outlines of Ancient and Christian Demonology (1926)
- Problems of Ancient Religious Syncretism in Connection to Motives of Old Ukrainian Legendary Fiction (1927)
- On the Character of Witch Persecution in Old Ukraine (1928)
- Peasant Movements in the Roman Empire (1930)
- Émile Durkheim's Sociological Theory of Religion and the School of M. Hrushevsky (1931)

== Bibliography ==
- A. Gorman. A Choice Between Two Evils: My Family’s Story of Tragedy And Survival Xlibris Corp, 2006. ISBN 978-1-4134-8420-5
- (In Ukrainian) I. В. Верба. Кость Штеппа (на укр. языке) // Український історичний журнал. 1999. № 3
- (In Ukrainian) I. В. Верба. Кость Штеппа (окончание, на укр. языке) // Український історичний журнал. 1999. № 3
- (In Russian) XX век — История одной семьи / Под ред. А. В. Попова. М., 2003. (Материалы к истории русской политической эмиграции. Вып. 7)
- (in Ukrainian) I. В. Верба, М. О. Самофалов. Iсторик Кость Штеппа: людина, вчений, педагог. Київ, 2010. ISBN 978-9668999239

Educational offices
Preceded by Oleksiy Rusko	Rector of Kyiv University (under Nazi occupation); 1941–1942	Succeeded by Oleksiy Rusko
