= Ivan Obreimov =

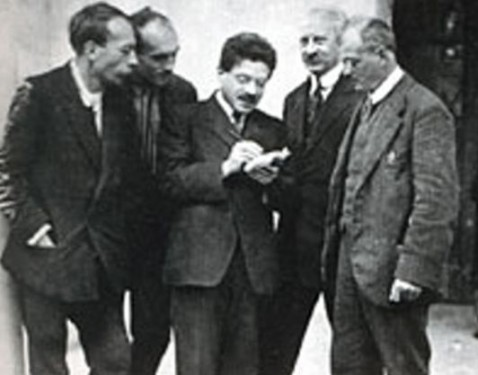
In 1924, left to right - Obreimov, Nikolay Semyonov, Paul Ehrenfest, Abram Ioffe, and Aleksandr Chernyshyov

Ivan Vasilevich Obreimov (8 March 1894 – 2 December 1981) was a Russian and Soviet physicist. He worked on optics, spectroscopy, and cryogenics and was involved in the establishment of the low temperature physics institute in Kiev. He was imprisoned during the Stalinist purges but released.

Obreimov was born in a family of a mathematics teacher Vasily Ivanovich who was forced to leave his work in the Urals and leave Russia for unknown reasons. Ivan was born in Annecy, France, and the Obreimov family returned to Russia. The family lived under a false name but was later able to obtain pardon and settled in St. Petersburg. The father then taught at Lesnoy where Ivan was educated. In his fifth grade he was taught by Abraham Fedorovich Ioffe and he also studied botany under Gennady Nikolayevich Boch (1871–1942). The family moved to Gatchina when his father died in 1909 and he graduated with a gold medal in 1910.

He then joined St. Petersburg and studied physics. He attended the lectures of Andrey Markov on probability and Orest Khvolson on thermodynamics. He also attended plant physiology courses by Vladimir Palladin and E. S. Fedorov on crystallography. He joined the scientific circle that studied the works of Pavel Ehrenfest and others. He attended the Mendeleev Congress in the winter of 1911-12 where he met L.A. Chugaev, Svante A. Arrhenius, G. H. Tamman. He worked with Tamman in 1913 and wrote a thesis on magnetism and polarization in iodine and chromyl chloride. Graduating in 1915 he moved to work on a new glass factory in the area of optical engineering with D. S. Rozhdestvensky. This helped produce high quality binoculars at the Obukhovsky plant. Following the revolution he moved to the university and joined the college of optical technology under Rozhdestvensky. He also worked with A. A. Lebedev. In 1924 he started a molecular physics laboratory and later became the deputy director under A.F. Ioffe. He also began to experiment in cryospectroscopy, the study of color change in crystals on cooling. In 1928 the institute of physical technology moved to Kharkov. He visited Germany and England for purchase equipment in 1929-30. Visitors to the institute included P.A.M. Dirac, Niels Bohr, and G. A. Gamov. Other groups worked on nuclear physics and on superconductivity. The institute began to be investigated by the NKVD and various people were detained during the UPTI affair and in 1938 Obreimov was taken to Butyrskaya prison. Here he continued to work on Fresnel diffraction. His wife and colleagues worked to free him. He was finally released on 24 May 1941. He served in Yoshkar-Ola during the war years.

In 1947 he moved to a new laboratory in Moscow. He took an interest in plants and was also involved in collaborations with biologists and worked on mathematics of cell growth. He collaborated with Boris Perfilyev on single cell capillary chambers to study cell biology.

In 1946 he was awarded the State Prize. Apart from physics he took an interest in botany, mathematics and chemistry, spoke five languages and played the piano.
