= List of Russian scientists =

== Polymaths ==
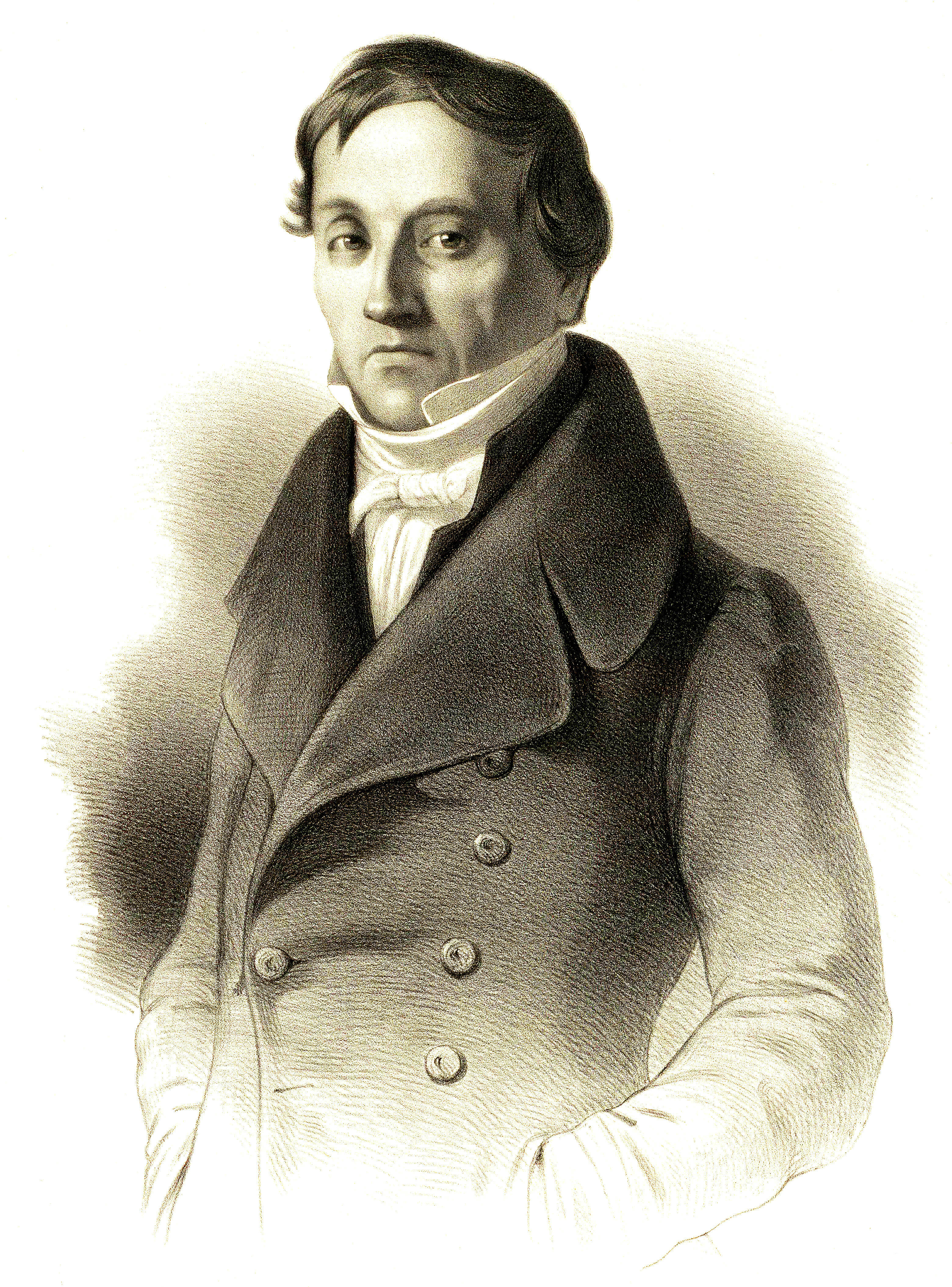
Baer

- Karl Ernst von Baer, polymath naturalist, formulated the geological Baer's law on river erosion and embryological Baer's laws, founder of the Russian Entomological Society, co-founder of the Russian Geographical Society
- Alexander Borodin, chemist and composer, author of the famous opera Prince Igor, discovered Borodin reaction, co-discovered Aldol reaction
- Alexander Chizhevsky, interdisciplinary scientist, biophysicist, philosopher and artist, founder of heliobiology and modern air ionification, Russian cosmist
- Johann Gottlieb Georgi, naturalist, chemist, mineralogist, ethnographer and explorer, the first to describe omul fish of Baikal, published the first full-scale work on ethnography of indigenous peoples of Russia
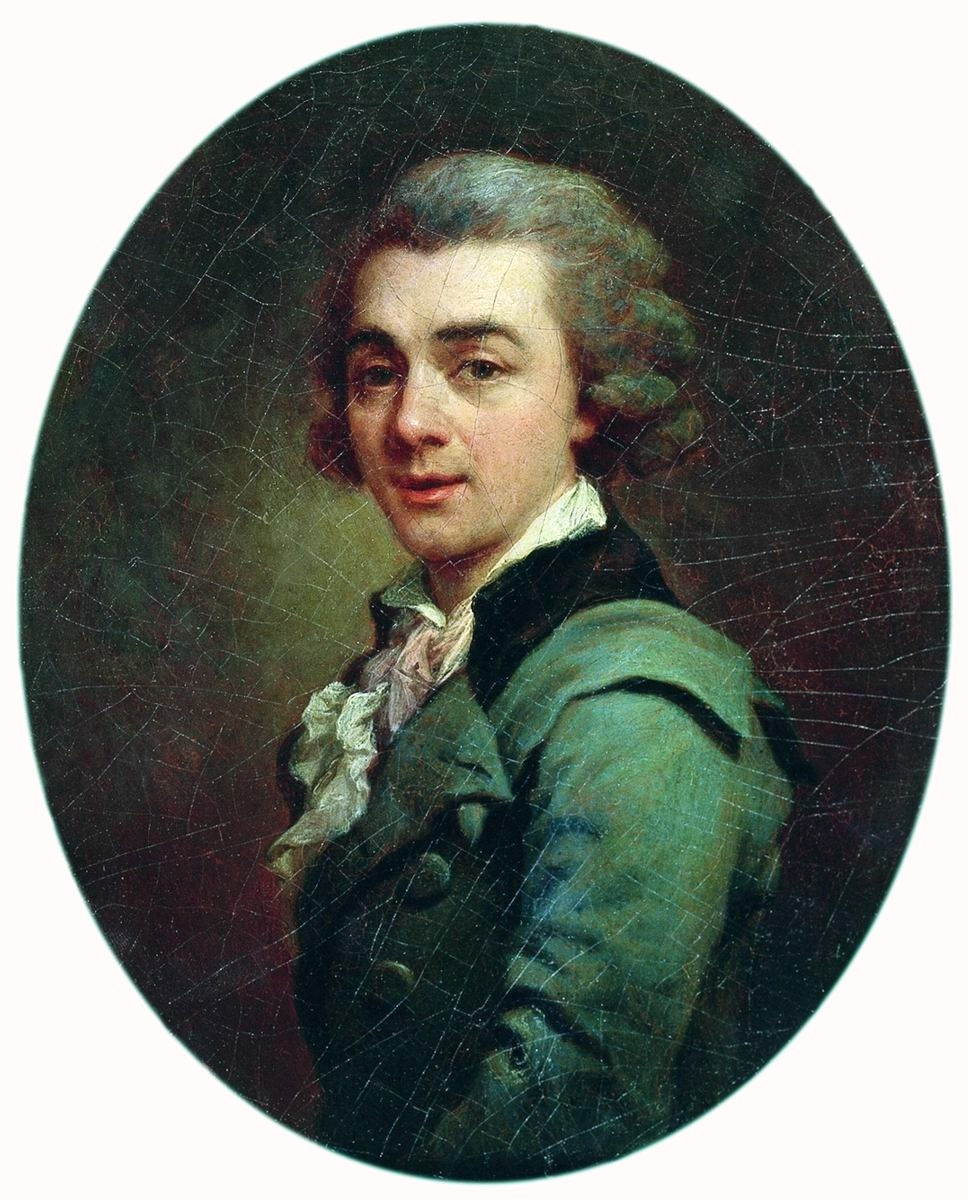
  Lvov
- Mikhail Lomonosov, polymath scientist, artist and inventor; founder of the Moscow State University; proposed the law of conservation of matter; disproved the phlogiston theory; invented coaxial rotor and the first helicopter; invented the night vision telescope and off-axis reflecting telescope; discovered the atmosphere of Venus; suggested the organic origin of soil, peat, coal, petroleum and amber; pioneered the research of atmospheric electricity; coined the term physical chemistry; the first to record the freezing of mercury; co-developed Russian porcelain, re-discovered smalt and created a number of mosaics dedicated to Petrine era; author of an early account of Russian history and the first opponent of the Normanist theory; reformed Russian literary language by combining Old Church Slavonic with vernacular tongue in his early grammar; influenced Russian poetry through his odes
- Nikolay Lvov, polymath artist, geologist, philologist and ethnographer, compiled the first major collection of Russian folk songs, adapted rammed earth technology for northern climate and built the Priory Palace in Gatchina, pioneered HVAC technology, invented carton-pierre
- Alexander Middendorf, zoologist and explorer, discoverer of Putorana Plateau, founder of permafrost science, studied the influence of permafrost on living beings, coined the term radula, prominent hippologist and horse breeder
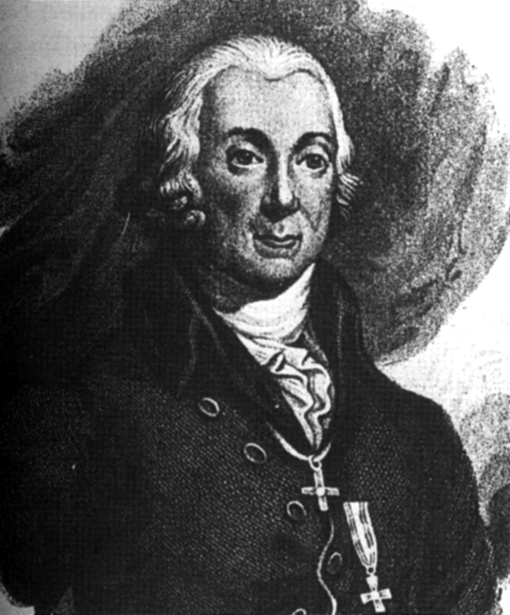
  Pallas
- Vladimir Obruchev, geologist, paleontologist, geographer and explorer of Siberia and Central Asia, author of the comprehensive Geology of Siberia and two popular science fiction novels, Plutonia and Sannikov Land
- Peter Simon Pallas, polymath naturalist, geographer, ethnographer, philologist, explorer of European Russia and Siberia, discoverer of the first pallasite meteorite (Krasnojarsk) and multiple animals, including the Pallas's cat, Pallas's squirrel, and Pallas's gull
- Yakov Perelman, a founder of popular science, author of many popular books, including the Physics Can Be Fun and Mathematics Can Be Fun
- Nicholas Roerich, artist, writer, philosopher, archeologist, explorer of Central Asia, public figure, initiator of the international Roerich's Pact on the defense of cultural objects, author of over 7000 paintings
- Pyotr Semyonov-Tyan-Shansky, geographer, geologist, entomologist, explorer of the Tian Shan Mountains, discoverer of the Peak Khan Tengri, for 40 years the head of the Russian Geographical Society, statistician, organiser of the first Russian Empire Census
- Vasily Tatishchev, statesman, economist, geographer, ethnographer, philologist and historian, supervisor of the first instrumental mapping of Russia, coloniser of the Urals and Siberia, founder of Perm and Yekaterinburg, discovered and published Russkaya Pravda, Sudebnik of 1550 and the controversial Ioachim Chronicle, wrote the first full-scale account of Russian history, compiled the first encyclopedic dictionary of Russian language
- Vladimir Vernadsky, philosopher and geologist, a founder of geochemistry, biogeochemistry and radiogeology, creator of noosphere theory, popularized the term biosphere, major Russian cosmist
- Ivan Yefremov, paleontologist, philosopher, sci-fi and historical novelist, founder of taphonomy, author of The Land of Foam , Andromeda: A Space-Age Tale and Thais of Athens

== Earth scientists ==
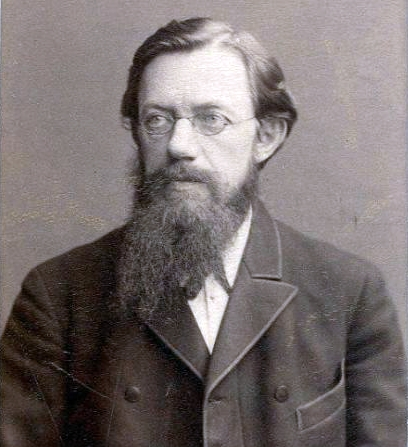
Chersky

- Dmitry Anuchin, anthropologist and geographer, coined the term anthroposphere, determined the location of the Volga river source
- Karl Baer, naturalist, formulated the geological Baer's law on river erosion, co-founder of the Russian Geographical Society
- Lev Berg, determined the depth of Central Asian lakes, including Balkhash and Issyk Kul, a head of the Soviet Geographical Society
- Leonid Brekhovskikh, founder of modern acoustical oceanography, discovered the deep sound channel, the first to observe mesoscale ocean eddies
- Ivan Chersky, paleontologist, geologist and explorer of Siberia, explained the origin of Lake Baikal, pioneered the geomorphological evolution theory
- Pyotr Chikhachyov, early geographer and geologist of Central Asia, discovered Kuznetsk Coal Basin
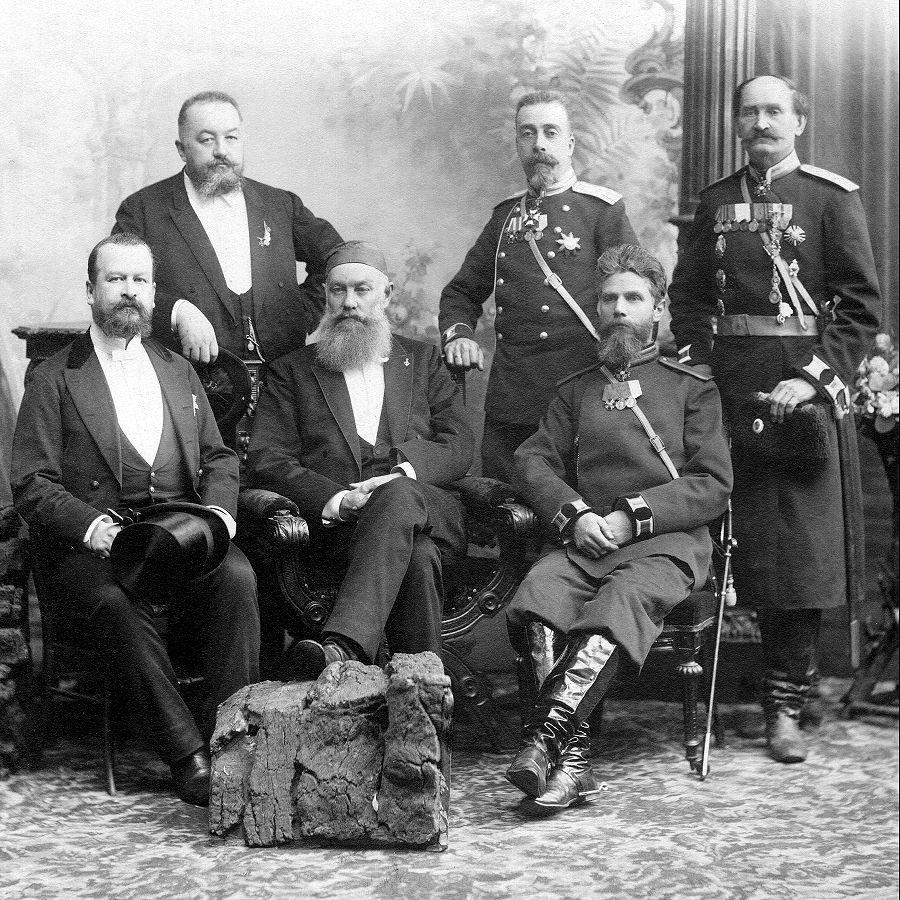
  Dokuchaev
- Vasily Dokuchaev, founder of soil science, created the first soil classification, determined the five factors for soil formation
- Alexander Fersman, a founder of geochemistry, discovered copper in Monchegorsk, apatites in Khibiny, sulfur in Central Asia
- Boris Golitsyn, inventor of electromagnetic seismograph, the president of International Association of Seismology
- Grigory Gamburtsev, major Soviet seismologist, invented a number of seismological methods and devices
- Ivan Gubkin, founder of the Gubkin Russian State University of Oil and Gas
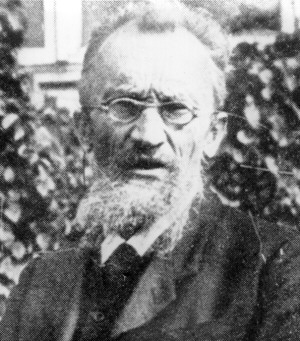
  Köppen
- Alexander Karpinsky, geologist and mineralogist, the first President of the Soviet Academy of Sciences
- Alexander Keyserling, naturalist, a founder of Russian geology
- Maria Klenova, a founder of marine geology, polar explorer
- Wladimir Köppen, meteorologist, author of the commonly used Köppen climate classification
- Stepan Krasheninnikov, geographer, the first Russian naturalist, made the first scientific description of Kamchatka
- Alexander Kruber, founder of Russian karstology
- Nikolai Kudryavtsev, author of modern abiogenic theory for origin of petroleum, coordinated oil and gas exploration in Siberia
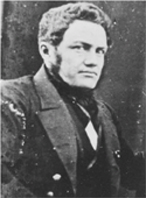
  Middendorf
- Leonid Kulik, meteorite researcher, the first to study the Tunguska event
- Mikhail Lomonosov, polymath, suggested the organic origin of soil, peat, coal, petroleum and amber; forerunner of the continental drift theory, pioneer researcher of atmospheric electricity
- Alexander Middendorf, zoologist and explorer, founder of permafrost science, determined the southern border of permafrost
- Pavel Molchanov, meteorologist, inventor of radiosonde
- Ivan Mushketov, made the first geological map of Turkestan
- Vladimir Obruchev, geologist and explorer, author of the comprehensive Geology of Siberia and two popular science fiction novels,
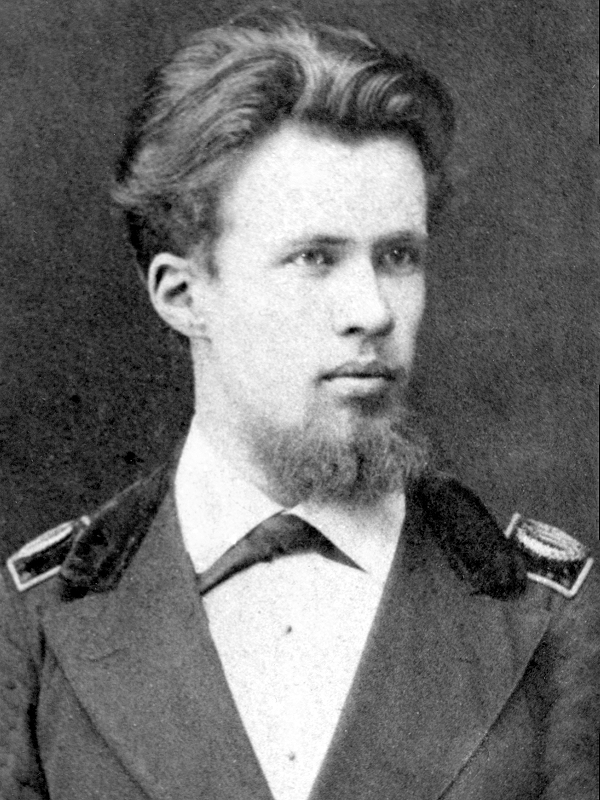
  Obruchev
  Plutonia and Sannikov Land
- Mikhail Pomortsev, meteorologist, inventor of nephoscope
- Farman Salmanov, discoverer of giant oil fields in West Siberia
- Pyotr Semyonov-Tyan-Shansky, explorer of the Tian Shan Mountains, for 40 years the head of the Russian Geographical Society, prominent statistician and organiser of the first Russian Empire Census
- Nikolay Shatsky, made a comprehensive tectonic map of North Eurasia, introduced Riphean and Baikalian geological stages
- Pyotr Shirshov, polar explorer, founder of the Shirshov Institute of Oceanology, proved that there is life in high latitudes of the Arctic Ocean
- Yuly Shokalsky, the first head of the Soviet Geographical Society, coined the term World Ocean
- Elizabeth Soshkina, geologist, biologist, paleontologist
- Aleksey Tillo, made the first correct hypsometric map of European Russia, coined the term Central Russian Upland, measured the lengths of main Russian rivers
- Andrey Tikhonov, mathematician and inventor of magnetotellurics in geology
- Vladimir Vernadsky, philosopher and geologist, a founder of geochemistry, biogeochemistry and radiogeology, creator of noosphere theory, popularized the term biosphere
- Nadejda Voronets, Russian geologist and one of the first women paleontologists in Russia; specialist in Mesozoic mollusks of the North and Far East of the USSR.
- Irina Pavlovna Zarutskaya, Soviet geomorphologist, cartographer, editor-in-chief of the map production department during the creation of the 1:2,500,000 scale Hypsometric Map of the USSR

== Biologists and paleontologists ==
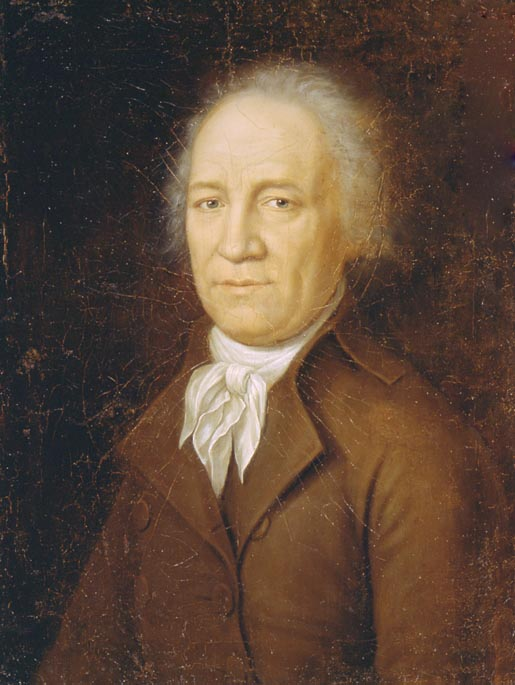
Bolotov

- Johann Friedrich Adam, discoverer of the Adams mammoth, the first complete woolly mammoth skeleton
- Karl Baer, naturalist, founder of the Russian Entomological Society, formulated embryological Baer's laws
- Jacques von Bedriaga, prominent herpetologist, described Bedriaga's rock lizard and Bedriaga's skink
- Dmitry Belyayev, domesticated silver fox
- Lev Berg, ichthyologist of Central Asia and European Russia
- Nikolai Bernstein, neurophysiologist, coined the term biomechanics
- Andrey Bolotov, major 18th-century agriculturist, discovered dichogamy, pioneered cross-pollination
  Ivanovsky
- August von Bongard, botanist of Alaska, discoverer of Sitka spruce and red alder
- Alexander Bunge, major botanist of Siberia (especially Altai)
- Mikhail Chailakhyan, researcher of flowering, described the florigen hormone
- Sergei Chetverikov, pioneer of modern evolutionary synthesis
- Alexander Chizhevsky, founder of heliobiology and modern air ionification
- Zinaida Vissarionovna Ermol'eva, biochemist, independently synthesized penicillin during World War II.
- Eduard Eversmann, biologist and explorer, pioneer researcher of flora and fauna of southern Russia
- Andrey Famintsyn, plant physiologist, inventor of grow lamp, developer of symbiogenesis theory
- Yuri Filipchenko, entomologist, coined the terms microevolution and macroevolution
- Nikolay Gamaleya, microbiologist and pioneer of Russian vaccine research
- Johann Georg Gmelin, first researcher of Siberian flora
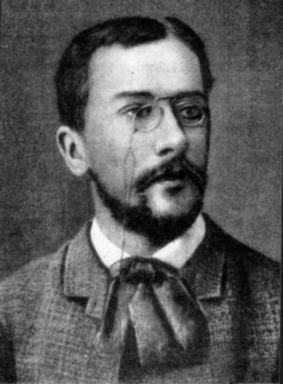
  Merezhkovsky
- Grigory Grum-Grshimailo, zoologist and geographer, obtained two Przewalski's horses and more than 1000 bird specimens from his travels in Central Asia
- Alexander Gurwitsch, originated the morphogenetic field theory and discovered the biophoton
- Ilya Ivanov, researcher of artificial insemination and the interspecific hybridization of animals, involved in controversial attempts to create a human-ape hybrid
- Dmitry Ivanovsky, discoverer of viruses
- Georgii Karpechenko, inventor of rabbage (the first ever non-sterile hybrid obtained through crossbreeding)
- Nikolai Koltsov, discoverer of cytoskeleton
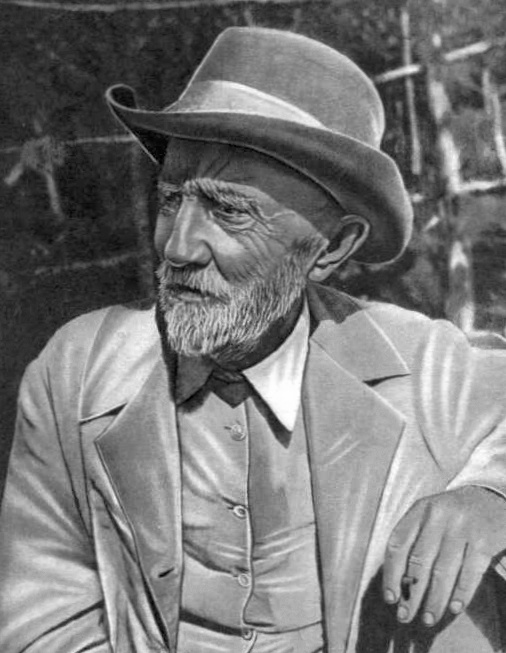
  Michurin
- Vladimir Komarov, plant geographer, President of the Soviet Academy of Sciences, founder of the Komarov Botanical Institute
- Alexander Kovalevsky, embryologist, major researcher of gastrulation
- Boris Kozo-Polyansky, botanist, and evolutionary biologist. First to support the theory of symbiogenesis with Darwinian evolution, and first director of The B.M. Kozo-Polyansky Botanical Garden of Voronezh State University.
- Trofim Lysenko, agronomist, developer of yarovization, infamous for lysenkoism
- Evgeny Maleev, discoverer of Talarurus, Tarbosaurus, and Therizinosaurus
- Carl Maximowicz, pioneer researcher of the Far Eastern flora
- Ilya Mechnikov, pioneer researcher of immune system, probiotics and phagocytosis, coined the term gerontology, Nobel Prize in Medicine winner
- Mikhail Menzbier, major ornithologist, discoverer of the Menzbier's marmot
- Konstantin Merezhkovsky, major lichenologist, developer of symbiogenesis theory, a founder of endosymbiosis theory
- Ivan Michurin, pomologist, selectionist and geneticist, practiced crossing of geographically distant plants, created hundreds of fruit cultivars
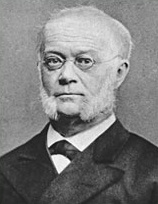
  Schrenck
- Alexander Middendorf, zoologist and explorer, studied the influence of permafrost on living beings, coined the term radula, prominent horse breeder
- Victor Motschulsky, prominent coleopterologist (researcher of beetles)
- Sergei Navashin, discovered double fertilization
- Alexey Olovnikov, predicted existence of Telomerase, suggested the Telomere hypothesis of aging and the Telomere relations to cancer
- Aleksandr Oparin, biologist and biochemist, proposed the "primordial soup" theory of life origin, showed that many food production processes are based on biocatalysis
- Heinz Christian Pander, embryologist, discoverer of germ layers
- Peter Simon Pallas, polymath naturalist and explorer, discoverer of multiple animals, including the Pallas's cat, Pallas's squirrel, and Pallas's gull
- Ivan Pavlov, founder of modern physiology, the first to research classical conditioning, Nobel Prize in Medicine winner
- Vladimir Pravdich-Neminsky, published the first EEG and the evoked potential of the mammalian brain
- Nikolai Przhevalsky, explorer and naturalist, brought vast collections from Central Asia, discovered the only extant species of wild horse

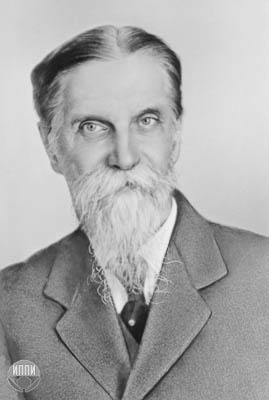
Timiryazev

- Anatoly Rozhdestvensky, discoverer of Aralosaurus and Probactrosaurus
- Ivan Schmalhausen, developer of modern evolutionary synthesis
- Leopold von Schrenck, ethnographer, zoologist, discovered the Amur sturgeon, Manchurian black water snake and Schrenck's bittern
- Boris Schwanwitsch, entomologist, applied colour patterns of insect wings to military camouflage during World War II
- Ivan Sechenov, founder of electrophysiology and neurophysiology
- Georg Wilhelm Steller, naturalist, participant of Vitus Bering's voyages, discoverer of Steller's jay, Steller's eider,
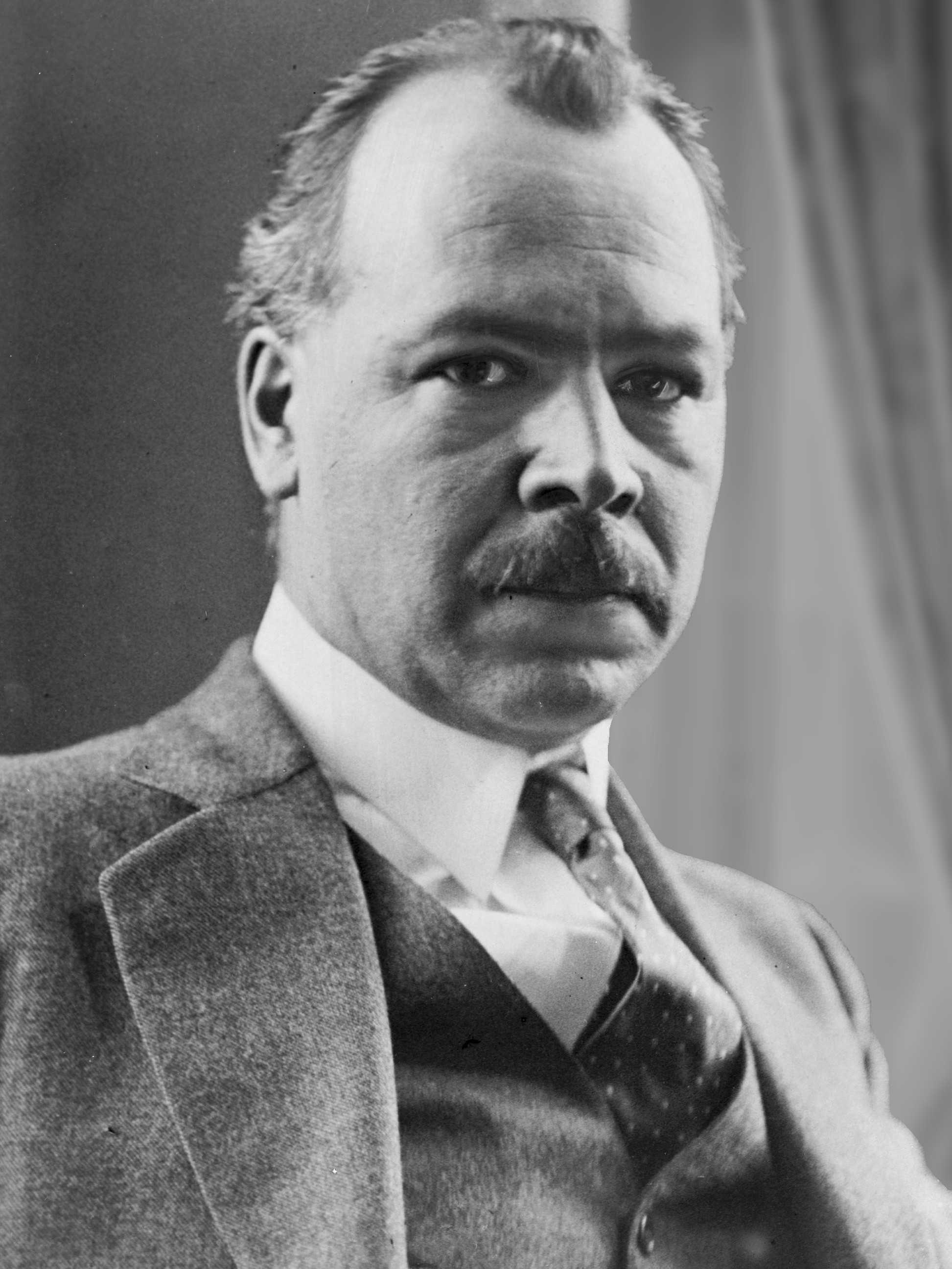
  Vavilov
  extinct Steller's sea cow and multiple other animals
- Lina Stern, pioneer researcher of blood–brain barrier and first female full member of the Russian Academy of Sciences
- Armen Takhtajan, developer of Takhtajan system of flowering plant classification, major biogeographer
- Kliment Timiryazev, plant physiologist and evolutionist, major researcher of chlorophyll
- Nikolai Timofeeff-Ressovsky, major researcher of radiation genetics, population genetics, and microevolution
- Lev Tsenkovsky, pioneer researcher of the ontogenesis of lower plants and animals
- Mikhail Tsvet, inventor of chromatography
- Nikolai Vavilov, botanist and geneticist,
  Vinogradsky
  gathered the world's largest collection of plant seeds, identified the centres of origin of main cultivated plants
- Mikhail Voronin, major researcher of fungi and plant pathology
- Sergey Vinogradsky, microbiologist, ecologist, and soil scientist, pioneered the biogeochemical cycle concept, discovered lithotrophy and chemosynthesis, invented the Winogradsky column for breeding of microorganisms
- Ivan Yefremov, paleontologist, sci-fi author, founded taphonomy
- Sergey Zimov, creator of the Pleistocene Park

== Physicians and psychologists ==
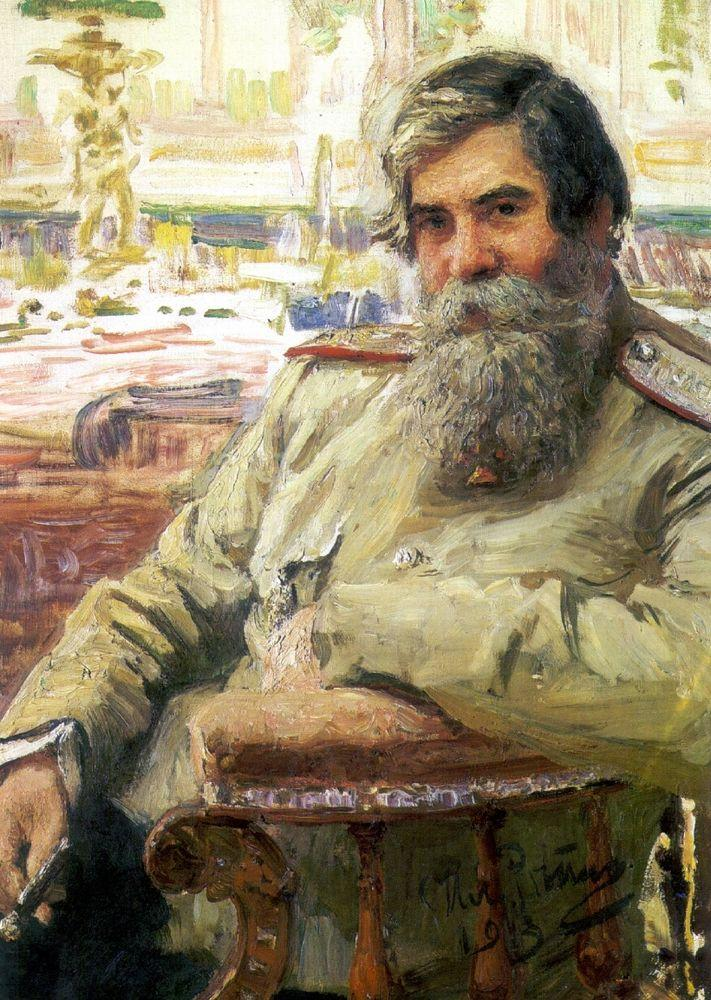
Bekhterev

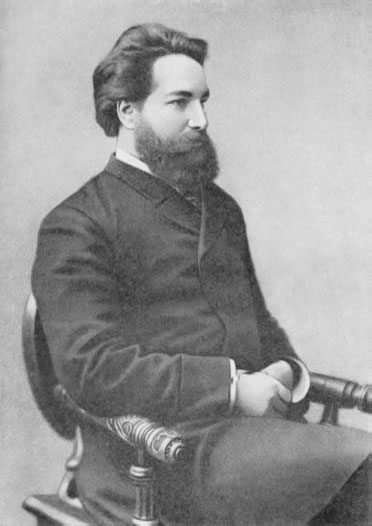
Korsakov

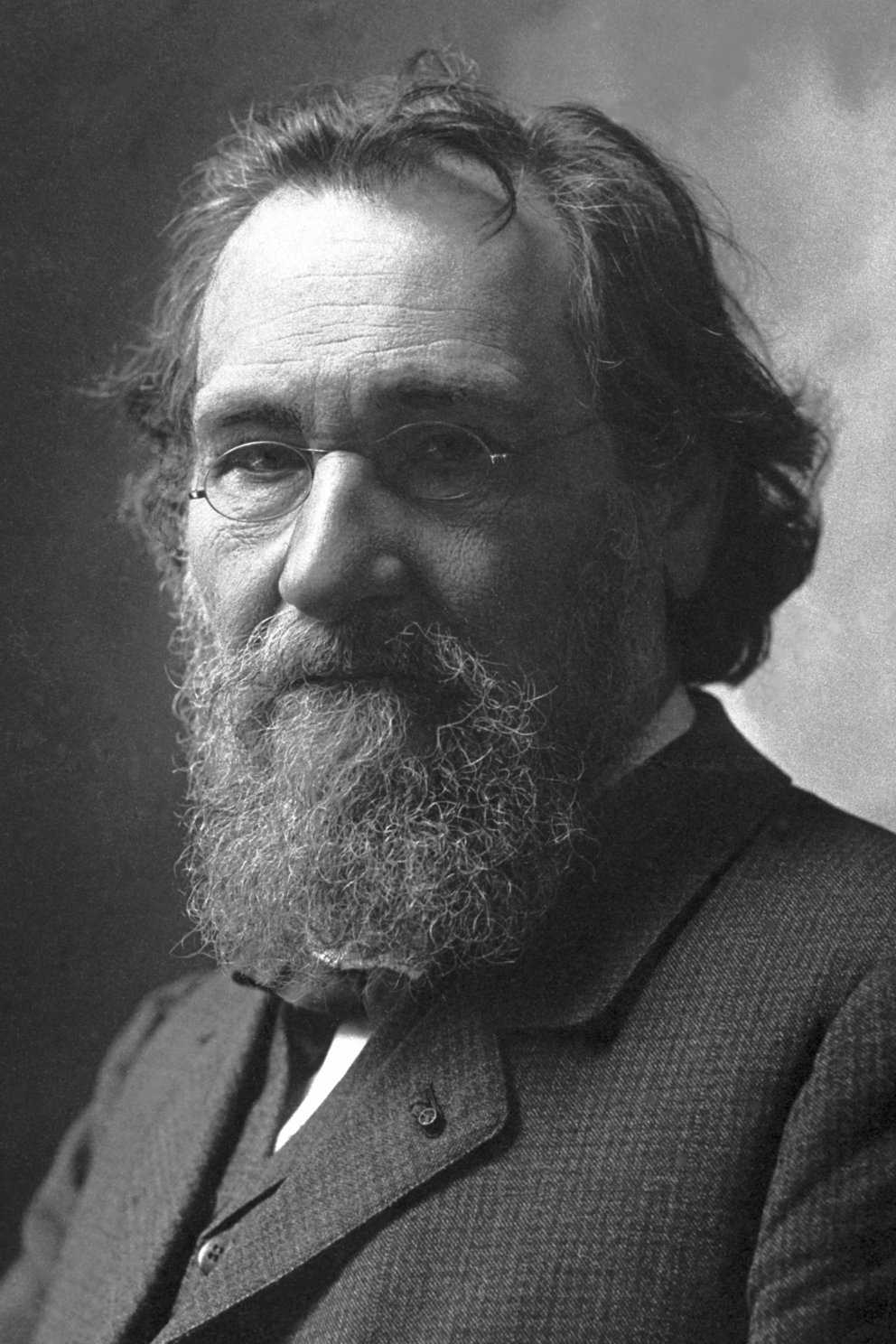
Mechnikov

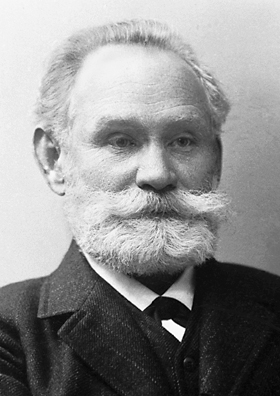
Pavlov

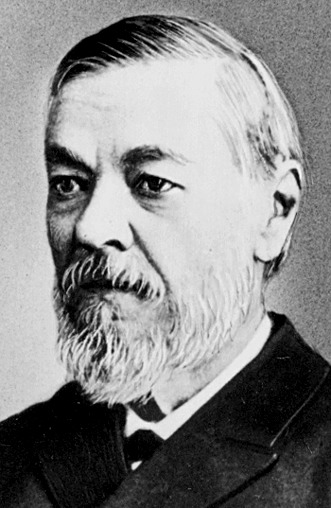
Sechenov

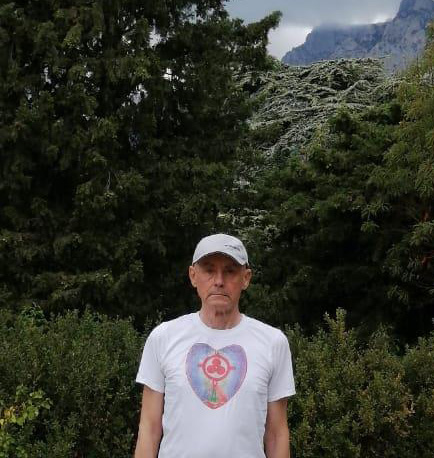
Skumin

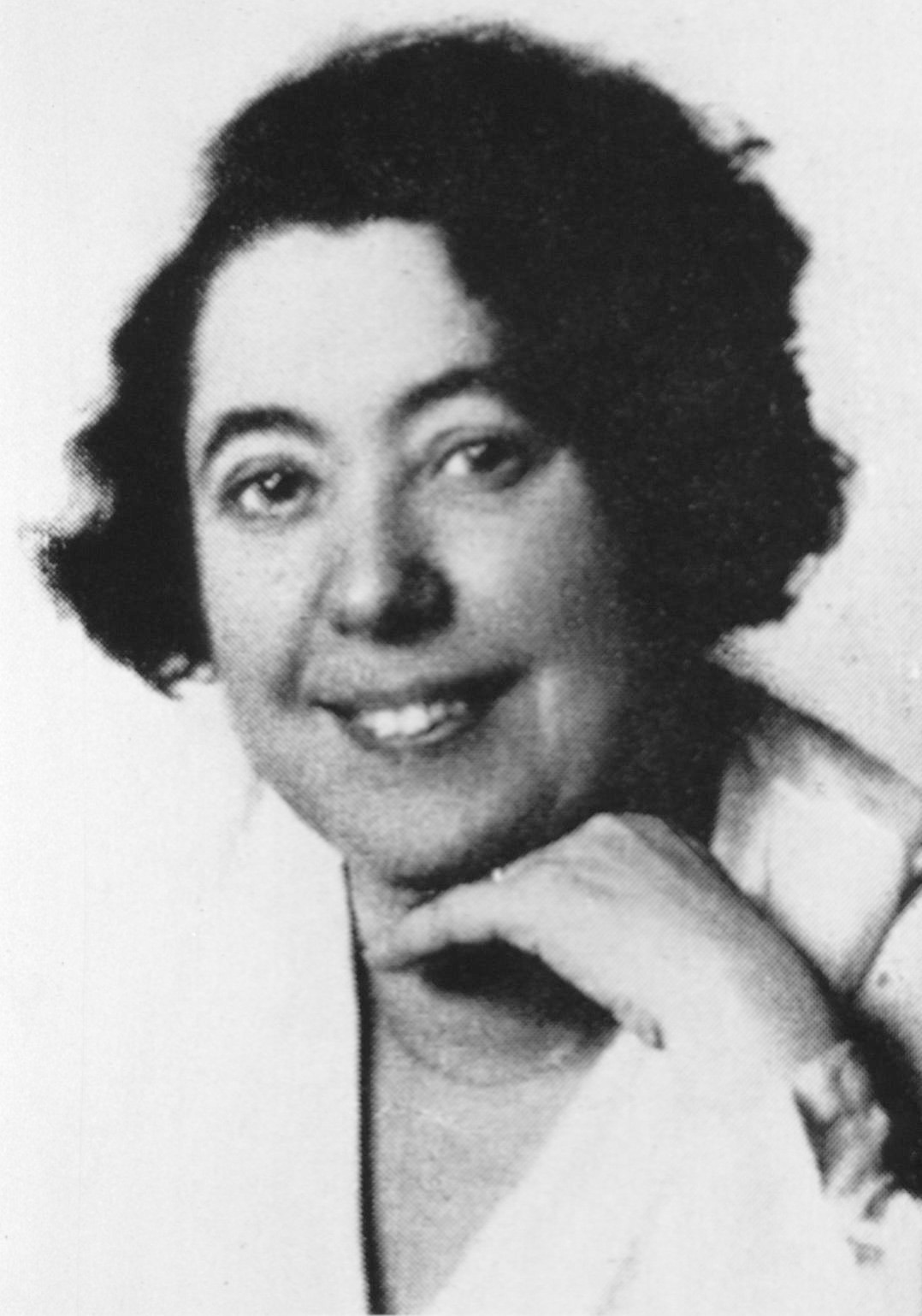
Stern

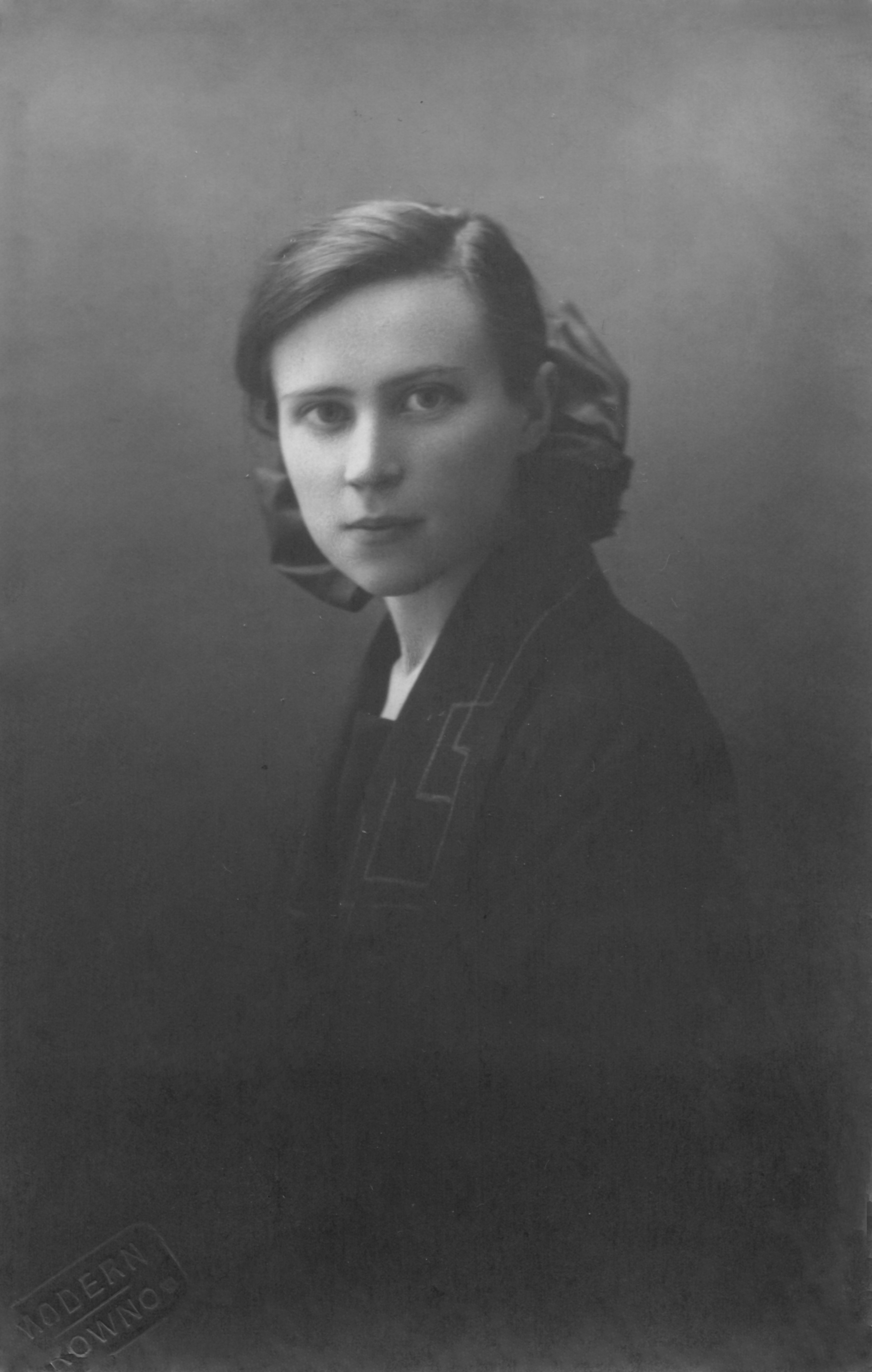
Zeigarnik

- Aleksandr Bakulev, prominent cardiovascular surgery developer
- Vladimir Bekhterev, neuropathologist, founder of objective psychology, noted the role of the hippocampus in memory, major contributor to reflexology, studied the Bekhterev's Disease
- Vladimir Betz, discovered Betz cells of primary motor cortex
- Peter Borovsky, described the causative agent of Oriental sore
- Sergey Botkin, major therapist and court physician
- Nikolay Burdenko, major developer of neurosurgery
- Konstantin Buteyko, developed the Buteyko method for the treatment of asthma and other breathing disorders
- Mikhail Chumakov, co-discovered tick-borne encephalitis, co-developed oral polio vaccine
- Livery Darkshevich, neurologist, described the nucleus of posterior commissure
- Vladimir Demikhov, major pioneer of transplantology
- Vladimir Filatov, ophthalmologist, corneal transplantation pioneer
- Svyatoslav Fyodorov, inventor of radial keratotomy
- Georgy Gause, inventor of gramicidin S and other antibiotics
- Oleg Gazenko, founder of space medicine, selected and trained Laika, the first space dog
- Vera Gedroitz, first female Professor of Surgery in the world
- Ilya Gruzinov, found that vocal folds are the source of phonation
- Waldemar Haffkine, invented the first vaccines against cholera and bubonic plague
- Gavriil Ilizarov, invented Ilizarov apparatus, developed distraction osteogenesis
- Nikolai Korotkov, invented auscultatory blood pressure measurement, pioneer of vascular surgery
- Sergey Korsakov, studied the effects of alcoholism on the nervous system, described Korsakoff's syndrome, introduced paranoia concept
- Aleksei Kozhevnikov, neurologist and psychiatrist, described the epilepsia partialis continua
- Aleksey Leontyev, founder of activity theory in psychology
- Peter Lesgaft, founder of the modern system of physical education in Russia
- Alexander Luria, co-developer of activity theory and cultural-historical psychology, major researcher of aphasia
- Ilya Mechnikov, pioneer researcher of immune system, probiotics and phagocytosis; coined the term gerontology, Nobel Prize in Medicine winner
- Lazar Minor, neurologist, described Minor's disease
- Pyotr Nikolsky, dermatologist, discoverer of Nikolsky's sign
- Alexey Olovnikov, predicted existence of Telomerase, suggested the Telomere hypothesis of aging and the Telomere relations to cancer
- Ivan Pavlov, founder of modern physiology, the first to research classical conditioning, influenced comparative psychology and behaviorism by his works on reflexes, Nobel Prize in Medicine winner
- Nikolay Pirogov, pioneer of ether anaesthesia and modern field surgery, the first to perform anaesthesia in the field conditions, invented a number of surgical operations
- Aza Rakhmanova, professor of diseases, AIDS expert
- Leonid Rogozov, performed an appendectomy on himself during the 6th Soviet Antarctic Expedition, a famous case of self-surgery
- Grigory Rossolimo, pioneer of child neuropsychology
- Vladimir Roth, neuropathologist, described meralgia paraesthetica
- Ivan Sechenov, founder of electrophysiology and neurophysiology, author of the classic work Reflexes of the Brain
- Vladimir Serbsky, founder of forensic psychiatry in Russia
- Nikolay Sklifosovskiy, prominent 19th-century field surgeon
- Victor Skumin, the first to describe a previously unknown disease, now called Skumin syndrome
- Lina Stern, pioneer researcher of blood–brain barrier
- Fyodor Uglov, oldest practicing surgeon in history
- Igor Ursov phthisiatrist, the inventor of intravenous intermittent bactericidal tuberculosis therapy
- Alexander Varshavsky, researched ubiquitination, Wolf Prize in Medicine winner
- Luka Voyno-Yasenetsky, founder of purulent surgery, saint
- Lev Vygotsky, founder of cultural-historical psychology, major contributor to child development and psycholinguistics, introduced zone of proximal development and cultural mediation concepts
- Josias Weitbrecht, first to describe the construction and function of intervertebral discs
- Sergei Yudin, inventor of cadaveric blood transfusion
- Bluma Zeigarnik, psychiatrist, discovered the Zeigarnik effect, founded experimental psychopathology

== Economists and sociologists ==
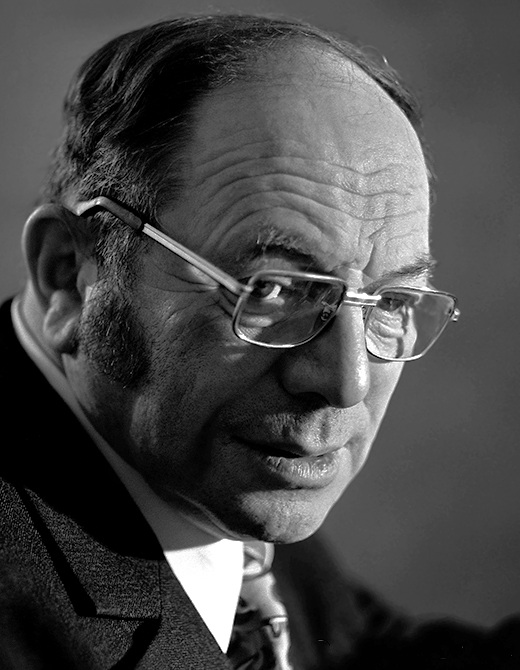
Kantorovich

- Alexander Chayanov, developed the consumption-labour-balance principle
- Georges Gurvitch, major developer of sociology of knowledge and sociology of law
- Leonid Kantorovich, mathematician and economist, founded linear programming, developed the theory of optimal allocation of resources, Nobel Prize in Economics winner
- Nikolai Kondratiev, discoverer of the Kondratiev waves
- Andrey Korotayev, historian and anthropologist, a founder of cliodynamics, a prominent developer of social cycle theory
- Gleb Krzhizhanovsky, developer of GOELRO plan, the first Chief of Gosplan
- Simon Kuznets, discovered the Kuznets swings, built the Kuznets curve, disproved the Absolute Income Hypothesis, Nobel Prize in Economics winner
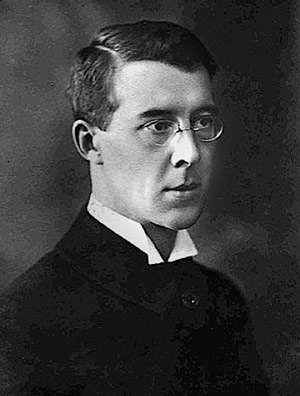
  Sorokin
- Evsei Liberman, laid the scientific support for the Soviet Kosygin reform (initiated by Alexei Kosygin) in economy
- Wassily Leontief, developed input-output analysis and the Leontief paradox, Nobel Prize in Economics winner
- Vasily Nemchinov, created the mathematical basis for the Soviet central planning
- Grigory Orlov, founder of the Free Economic Society
- Pitirim Sorokin, sociologist, prominent developer of the social cycle theory
- Eugen Slutsky, statistician and economist, developed the Slutsky equation
- Stanislav Strumilin, pioneer of the planned economy, developed the first five-year plans

== Historians and archaeologists ==
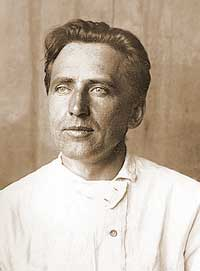
Artamonov

- Friedrich von Adelung, historian and museologist, researched the European accounts of the Time of Troubles
- Valery Alekseyev, anthropologist, proposed Homo rudolfensis
- Mikhail Artamonov, historian and archaeologist, founder of modern Khazar studies, excavated a great number of Scythian and Khazar kurgans and settlements, including the fortress of Sarkel
- Artemiy Artsikhovsky, archaeologist, discoverer of birch bark documents in Novgorod
- Vasily Bartold, turkologist, the "Gibbon of Turkestan", an archaeologist of Samarcand
- Konstantin Bestuzhev-Ryumin, 19th-century historian and paleographer, founder of the Bestuzhev Courses for women
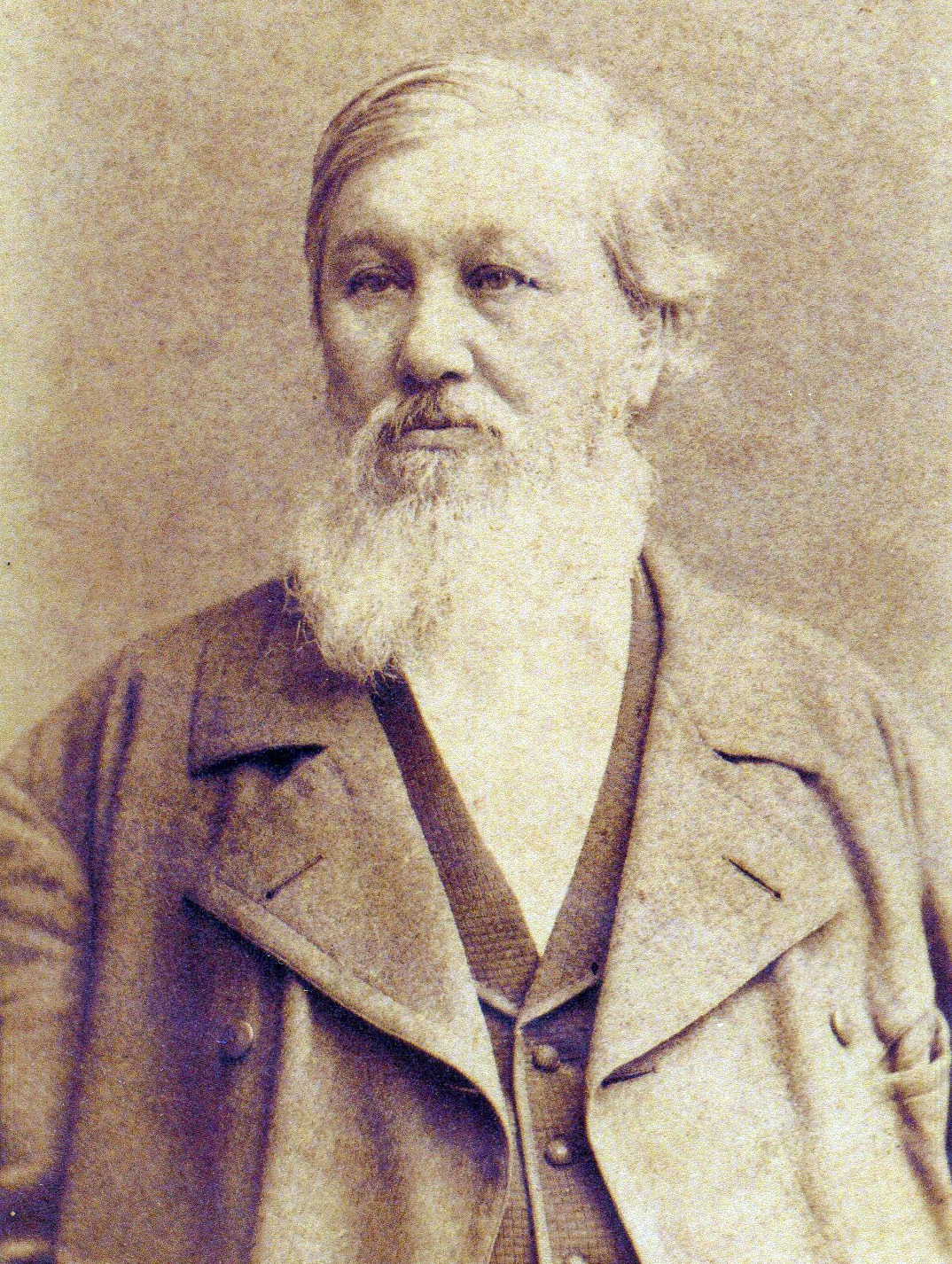
  Danilevsky
- Nikita Bichurin, a founder of Sinology, published many documents on Chinese and Mongolian history, opened the first Chinese-language school in Russia
- Nikolay Danilevsky, ethnologist, philosopher and historian, a founder of Eurasianism, the first to present an account of history as a series of distinct civilisations
- Igor Diakonov, historian and linguist, a prominent researcher of Sumer and Assyria
- Boris Farmakovsky, archaeologist of Ancient Greek colony Olbia
- Vladimir Golenishchev, egyptologist, excavated Wadi Hammamat, discovered over 6,000 antiquities, including the Moscow Mathematical Papyrus, the Story of Wenamun, and various Fayum portraits
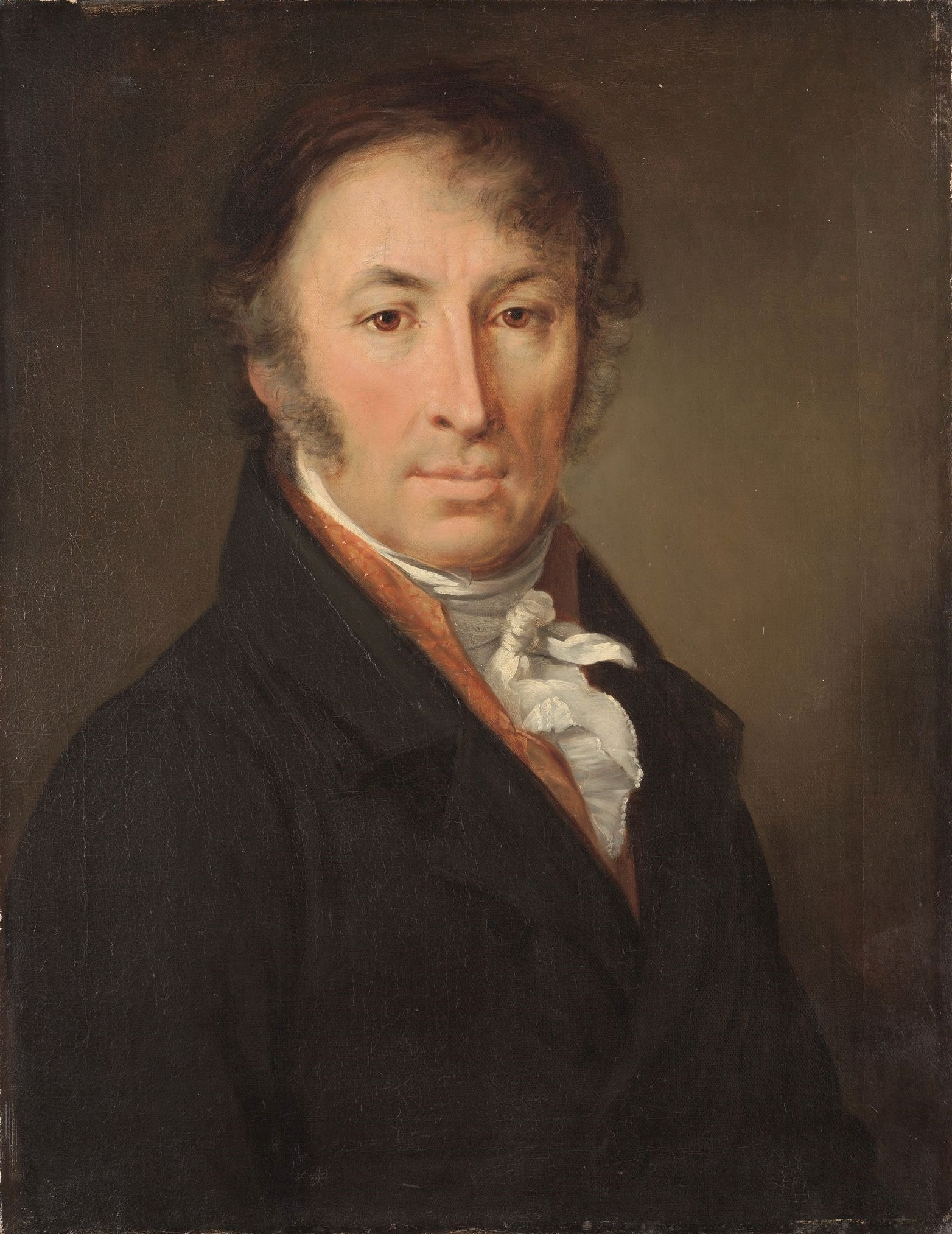
  Karamzin
- Timofey Granovsky, a founder of mediaeval studies in Russia, disproved the historicity of Vineta
- Boris Grekov, prominent researcher of Kievan Rus' and Golden Horde
- Lev Gumilev, historian and ethnologist, prominent researcher of ancient Central Asian peoples, related ethnogenesis and biosphere, influenced the rise of Neo-Eurasianism
- Boris Hessen, physicist who brought externalism into modern historiography of science
- Dmitry Ilovaysky, major 19th-century anti-Normanist
- Pyotr Kafarov, prominent sinologist, discovered many invaluable manuscripts, including The Secret History of the Mongols
- Nikolai Karamzin, sentimentalist writer and historian, author of the 12-volume History of the Russian State, the principal early 19th-century account of national history
- Vasily Klyuchevsky, dominated Russian historiography at the turn of the 20th century, shifted focus from politics and society to geography and economy
- Alexander Kazhdan, Byzantinist, editor of the Oxford Dictionary of Byzantium
- Nikodim Kondakov, prominent researcher of Byzantine art
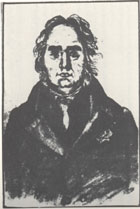
  Müller
- Andrey Korotayev, historian and anthropologist, a founder of cliodynamics, a prominent developer of social cycle theory
- Mykola Kostomarov, historian, folklorist and romantic writer, researched the differences between Great Russia and Little Russia and the history of Ukraine
- Pyotr Kozlov, explorer of Central Asia, discoverer of the ancient Tangut city of Khara-Khoto and Xiongnu royal burials at Noin-Ula
- Platon Levshin, president of the Most Holy Synod during the Age of Enlightenment, author of the first systematic course of the history of Russian Orthodox Church
- Nikolay Likhachyov, the first and foremost Russian sigillographer, prominent also in a number of other auxiliary historical disciplines
- Aleksey Lobanov-Rostovsky, statesman, published the major Russian Genealogical Book
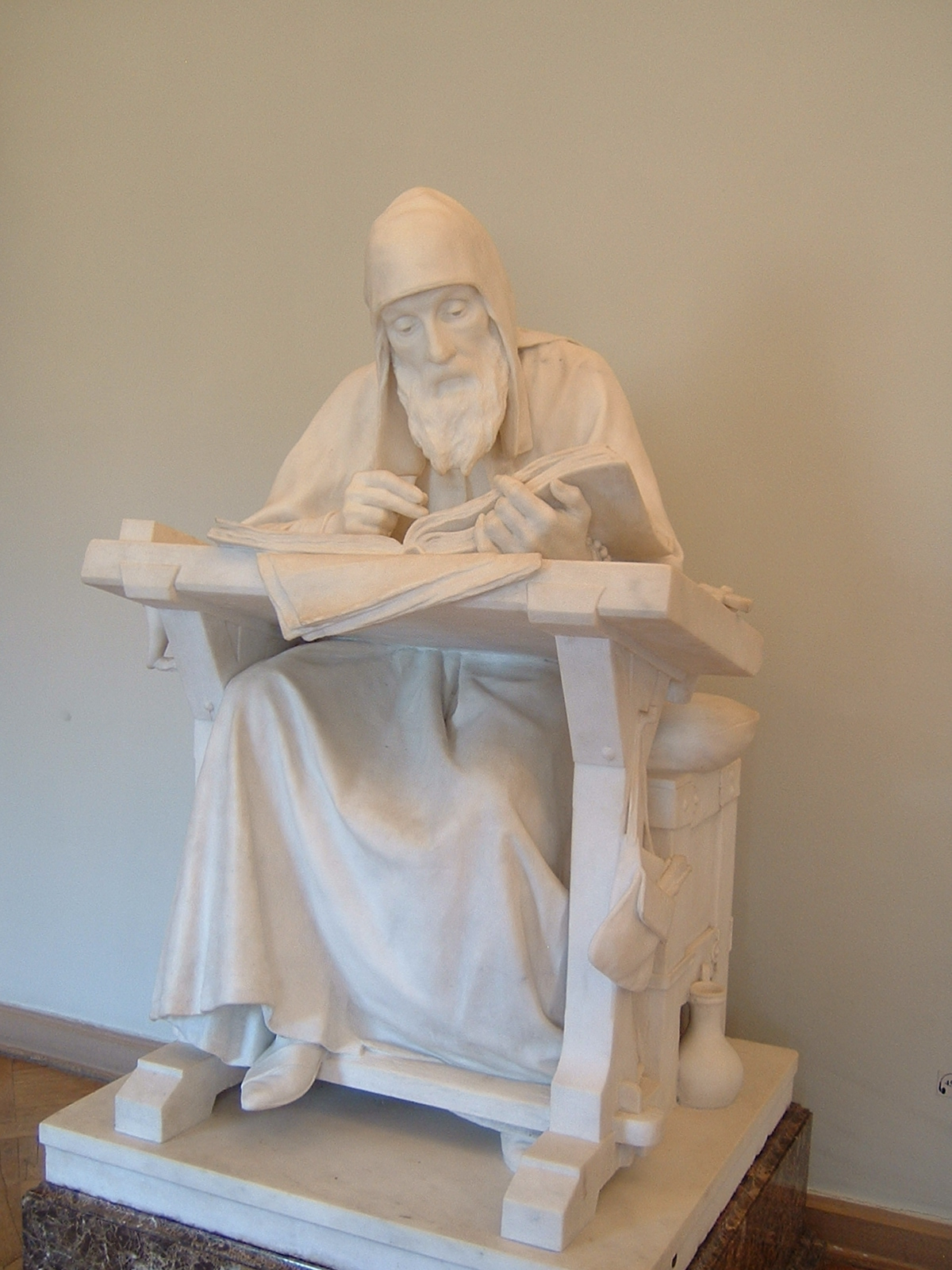
  Nestor
- Mikhail Lomonosov, polymath scientist and artist, the first opponent of the Normanist theory, published an early account of Russian history
- Boris Marshak, excavated the Sogdian ruins at Panjakent
- Friedrich Martens, legal historian, drafted the Martens Clause of the Hague Peace Conference
- Vladimir Minorsky, prominent historian of Persia
- Gerhardt Friedrich Müller, co-founder of the Russian Academy of Sciences, explorer and the first academic historian of Siberia, a founder of ethnography, author of the first academic account of Russian history, put forth the Normanist theory
- Aleksei Musin-Pushkin, prominent collector of ancient Russian manuscripts, discovered The Tale of Igor's Campaign
- Nestor the Chronicler, author of the Primary Chronicle (the first East Slavic chronicle) and several hagiographies, saint
- Dimitri Obolensky, Byzantine commonwealth researcher
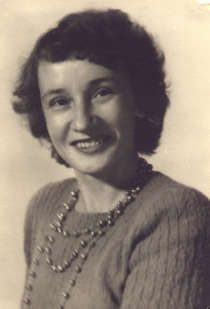
  Proskuryakova
- Alexey Okladnikov, prominent historian and archaeologist of Siberia and Mongolia
- Sergey Oldenburg, a founder of Russian Indology and the Academic Institute of Oriental Studies
- George Ostrogorsky, preeminent 20th-century Byzantinist
- Avraamy Palitsyn, 17th-century historian of the Time of Troubles
- Evgeny Pashukanis, legal historian, wrote The General Theory of Law and Marxism
- Boris Piotrovsky, prominent researcher of Urartu, Scythia, and Nubia, long-term director of the Hermitage Museum
- Mikhail Piotrovsky, orientalist, current director of the Hermitage Museum
- Mikhail Pogodin, leading mid-19th-century Russian historian, proponent of the Normanist theory
- Boris Polevoy, major historian of the Russian Far East
- Mikhail Pokrovsky, Marxist historian prominent in the 1920s
- Natalia Polosmak, archaeologist of Pazyryk burials, discoverer of Ice Maiden mummy
- Alexander Polovtsov, statesman, historian and Maecenas, founder of the Russian Historian Society
- Tatyana Proskuryakova, Mayanist scholar and archaeologist, deciphered the ancient Maya script
- Semyon Remezov, cartographer and the first historian of Siberia, author of the Remezov Chronicle
- Mikhail Rostovtsev, archeologist and economist, the first to thoroughly examine the social and economic systems of the Ancient World, excavated Dura-Europos
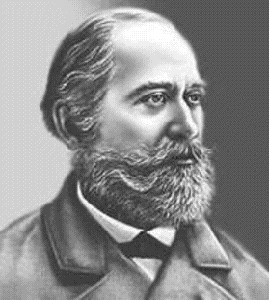
  Solovyov
- Nicholas Roerich, painter, archeologist, and public figure, explorer of Central Asia, initiator of the international Roerich's Pact on protection of historical monuments
- Sergei Rudenko, discoverer of Scythian Pazyryk burials
- Boris Rybakov, historian and chief Soviet archaeologist for 40 years, primary opponent of the Normanist theory
- Dmitry Samokvasov, Black Grave discoverer
- Viktor Sarianidi, discoverer of the Bactria-Margiana Archaeological Complex and the Bactrian Gold in Central Asia
- Mikhail Shcherbatov, a man of Russian Enlightenment, conservative historian
- Sergey Solovyov, principal Russian 19th-century historian, author of the 29-volume History of Russia
- Vasily Struve, orientalist and historian of the Ancient World, put forth the Marxist theory of five socio-economic formations that dominated the Soviet education
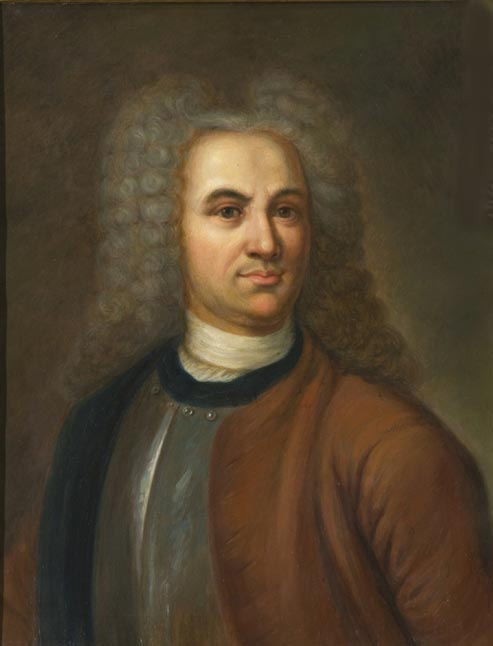
  Tatishchev
- Yevgeny Tarle, author of the famous studies on Napoleon's invasion of Russia and on the Crimean War
- Vasily Tatischev, statesman, geographer and historian, discovered and published Russkaya Pravda, Sudebnik of 1550 and the controversial Ioachim Chronicle, wrote the first full-scale account of Russian history
- Mikhail Tikhomirov, leading specialist in medieval Russian paleography, published the Complete Collection of Russian Chronicles
- Boris Turayev, author of the first full-scale History of Ancient East
- Peter Turchin, population biologist and historian, coined the term cliodynamics
- Fyodor Uspensky, Byzantinist, researcher of the Trapezuntine Empire
- Aleksey Uvarov, founder of the first Russian archaeological society, discovered over 750 ancient kurgans
- Vasily Vasilievsky, prominent 19th-century Byzantinist
- Alexander Vasiliev, author of a comprehensive History of the Byzantine Empire
- Nikolay Veselovsky, the first to excavate Afrasiab (the oldest part of Samarkand), as well as the Solokha and Maikop kurgans in Southern Russia
- Nikolai Yadrintsev, discoverer of Genghis Khan's capital Karakorum and the Orkhon script of ancient Türks
- Valentin Yanin, primary researcher of ancient birch bark documents
- Gennady Zdanovich, discoverer of Sintashta culture settlement Arkaim

== Linguists and ethnographers ==
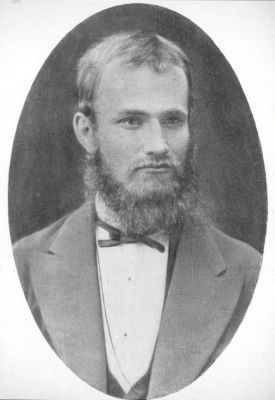
Baudouin de Courtenay

- Vasily Abaev, prominent researcher of Iranian languages
- Alexander Afanasyev, leading Russian folklorist, recorded and published over 600 Russian fairy tales, by far the largest folktale collection by any one man in the world
- Ivan Baudouin de Courtenay, co-inventor of the concept of phoneme and the systematic treatment of alternations, pioneer of synchronic analysis and mathematical linguistics
- Vladimir Bogoraz, researcher of Chukchi people, founder of the Institute of the Peoples of the North
- Otto von Böhtlingk, prominent Indologist and Sanskrit grammarian
- Fyodor Buslaev, philologist and folklorist, representative of the Mythological school of comparative literature
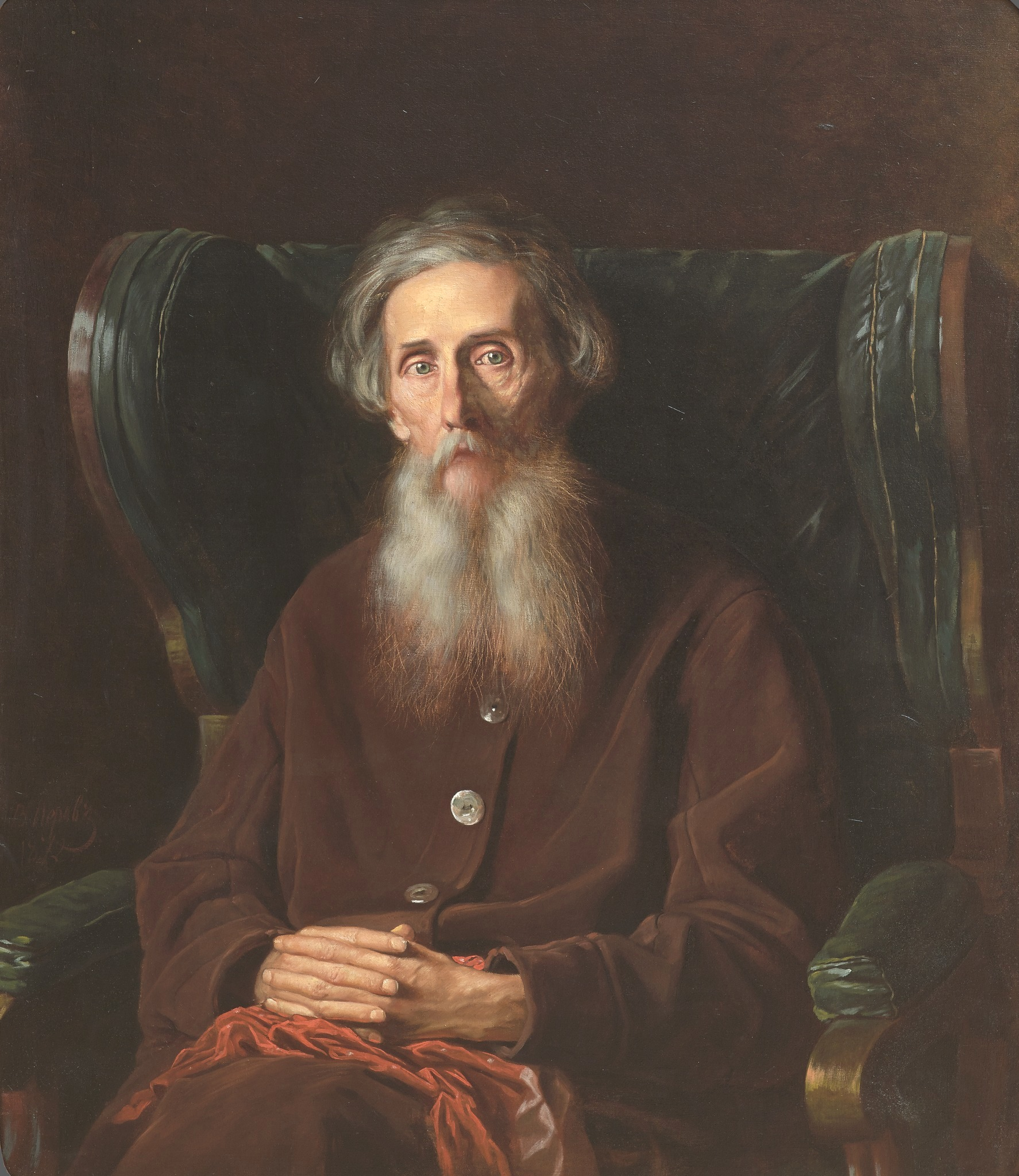
  Dahl
- Vladimir Dahl, greatest Russian language lexicographer of the 19th century, folklorist and turkologist, author of the Explanatory Dictionary of the Live Great Russian language
- Johann Gottlieb Georgi, explorer, published the first full-scale work on ethnography of indigenous peoples of Russia
- Dmitry Gerasimov, medieval translator, diplomat and philologist, correspondent of European Renaissance scholars
- Vladislav Illich-Svitych, founder of Nostratic linguistics
- Vyacheslav Ivanov, founder of glottalic theory of Indo-European consonantism
- Roman Jakobson, literary theorist and preeminent linguist of the 20th century, a founder of phonology, made numerous contributions to Slavic linguistics, author of Jackobson's Communication Model
- Wilhelm Junker, explorer and ethnographer of Equatorial Africa, studied the Zande people from Niam-Niam
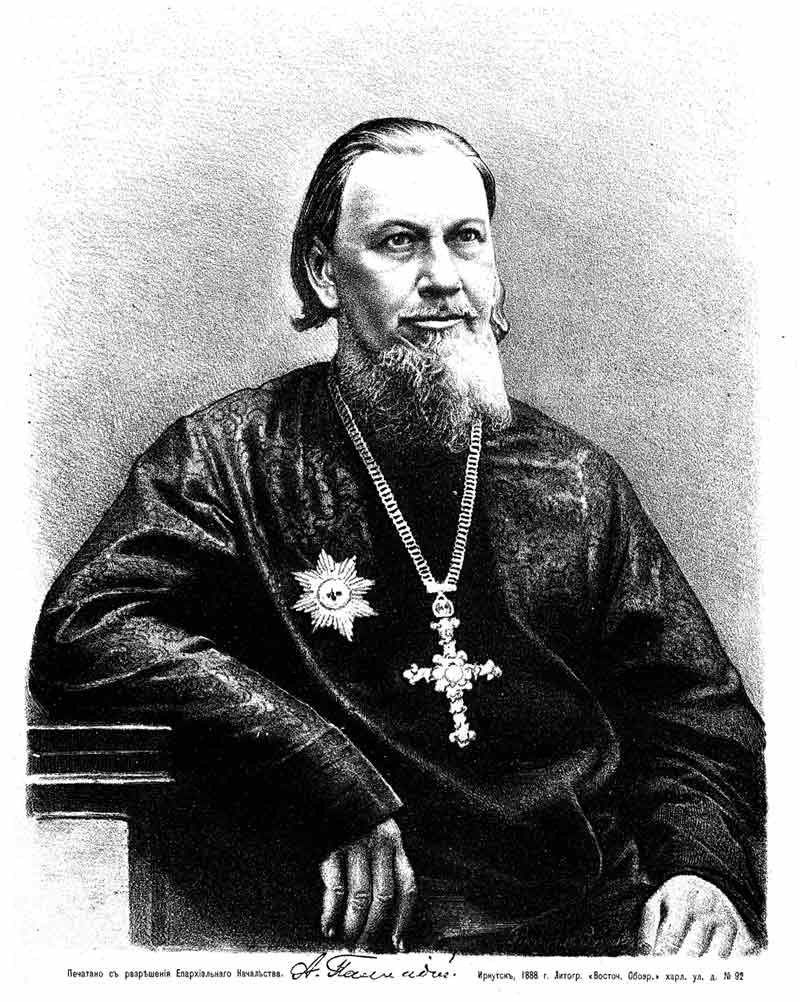
  Kafarov
- Pyotr Kafarov, prominent sinologist, developed the cyrillization of Chinese, discovered and published many invaluable manuscripts, including The Secret History of the Mongols
- Yuri Knorozov, linguist, epigrapher and ethnographer, deciphered the ancient Maya script, proposed a decipherment for the Indus script
- Evdokia Kozhevnikova, ethnologist whose writings on the Svan language were rediscovered in the 2010s
- Nikolay Krushevsky, co-inventor of the concept of phoneme and the systematic treatment of alternations
- Gerasim Lebedev, pioneer of Indology, introduced Bengali script typing to Europe, founded the first European-style drama theater in India
- Dmitry Likhachov, major 20th-century expert on Old Russian language and literature
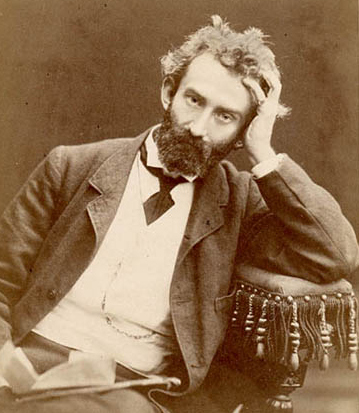
  Miklukho-Maklai
- Mikhail Lomonosov, polymath scientist and artist, wrote a grammar that reformed Russian literary language by combining Old Church Slavonic with vernacular tongue
- Juri Lotman, prominent literary scholar and semiotician
- Nikolay Lvov, polymath artist and scientist, compiled the first significant collection of Russian folk songs, published epic bylinas
- Richard Maack, naturalist and ethnographer of Siberia
- Sergey Malov, turkologist, classified the Turkic alphabets, deciphered ancient Orkhon script
- Nicholas Marr, put forth a pseudo-linguistic Japhetic theory on the origin of language
- Igor Melchuk, structural linguist, author of Meaning-Text Theory
- Nicholai Miklukho-Maklai, anthropologist who lived and traveled among the natives of Papua New Guinea and Pacific islands, prominent anti-racist
- Gerhardt Friedrich Müller, explorer and historian, a founder of ethnography
- Semyon Novgorodov, Yakut politician and linguist, creator of written Yakut language (Sakha scripts)
- Sergei Ozhegov, author of the most widely used explanatory dictionary of Russian language
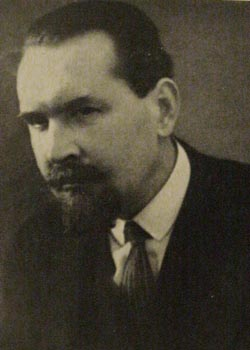
  Trubetzkoy
- Stephan of Perm, 14th-century missionary, converted Komi Permyaks to Christianity and invented the Old Permic script
- Yevgeny Polivanov, linguist, orientalist and polyglot, developed the cyrillization of Japanese
- Nicholas Poppe, prominent Altaic languages researcher
- Grigory Potanin, explorer of Central Asia, the first to research Salar people
- Vladimir Propp, formalist scholar, major researcher of folk tales and mythology
- Tatyana Proskuryakova, Mayanist scholar and archaeologist, deciphered the ancient Maya script
- George de Roerich, major 20th-century Tibetologist
- Franz Anton Schiefner, prominent tibetologist, Finnic and Caucasus languages researcher
- Isaac Jacob Schmidt, the first researcher of Mongolian
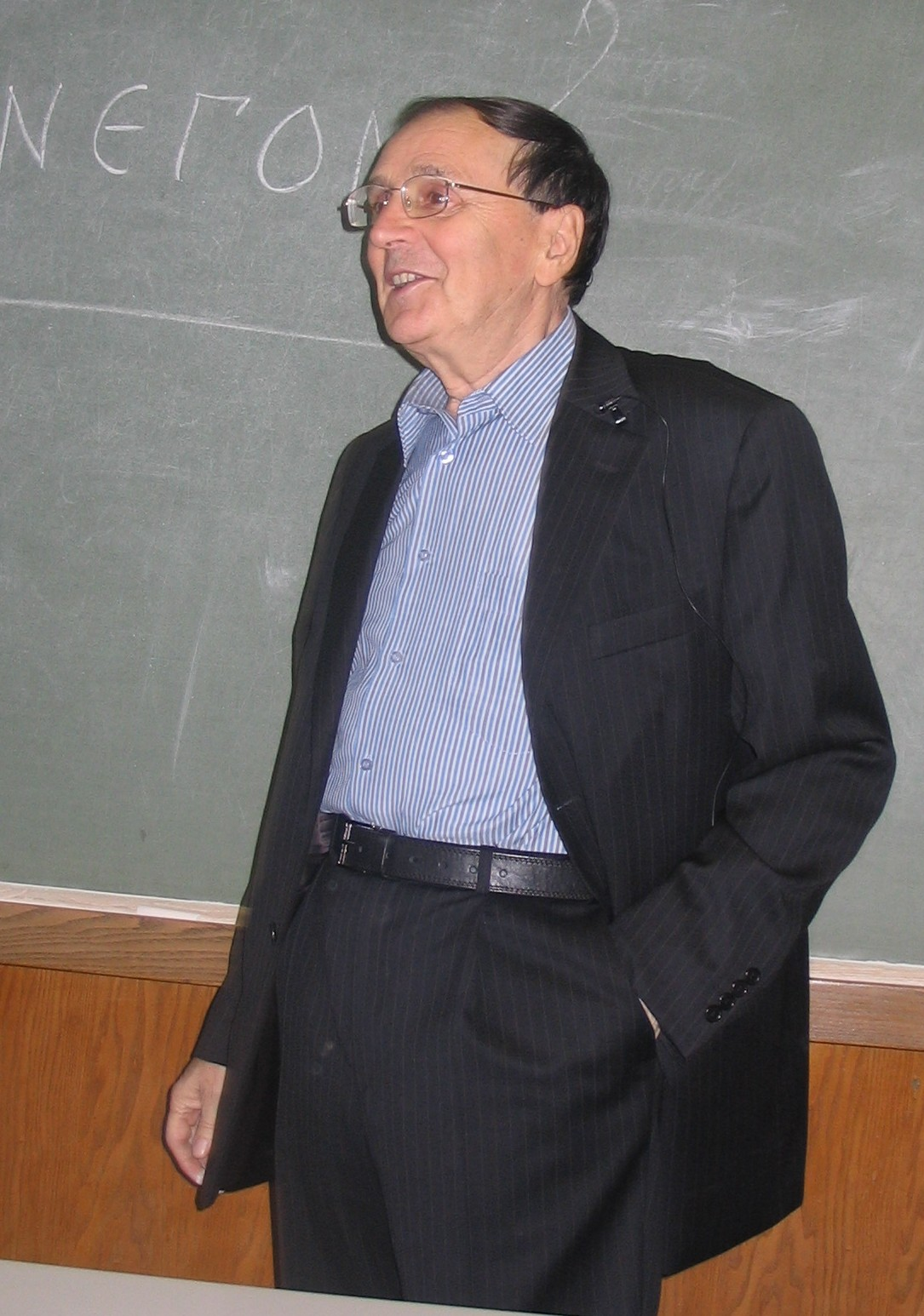
  Zaliznyak
- Leopold von Schrenck, naturalist and ethnographer, coined the term Paleo-Asiatic peoples, the first director of the Peter the Great Museum of Anthropology and Ethnography
- Aleksey Shakhmatov, a founder of textology, prepared major 20th-century reforms of Russian orthography, pioneered the systematic research of Old Russian and medieval Russian literature
- Lev Shcherba, phonetist and phonologist, author of the phrase "glokaya kuzdra"
- Fyodor Shcherbatskoy, Indologist, initiated the scholarly study of Buddhist philosophy in the West
- Ivan Snegiryov, early collector of Russian proverbs and researcher of lubok prints
- Izmail Sreznevsky, leading 19th-century Slavist, published Codex Zographensis, Codex Marianus and Kiev Fragments
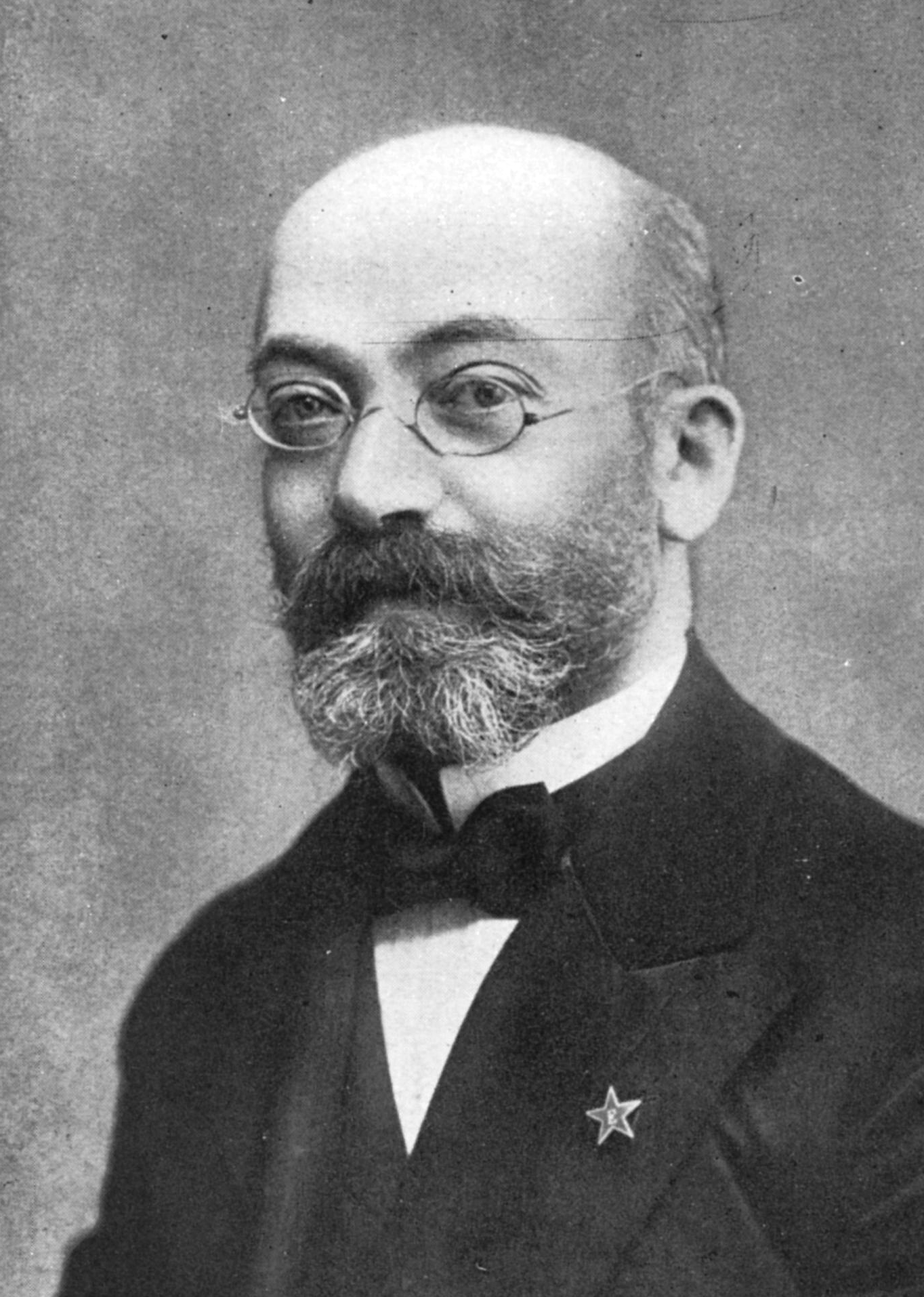
  Zamenhof
- Sergei Starostin, prominent supporter of Altaic languages theory, proposed Dené–Caucasian languages macrofamily, reconstructed a number of Eurasian proto-languages
- Stepan Stoichev (1891 – 1944), philologist, specialist in literary criticism, Head of Nizhniy Novgorod Pedagogical Institute
- Vasily Tatischev, geographer, ethnographer and historian, compiled the first encyclopedic dictionary of Russian
- Tenevil, Chukchi reindeer herder who created a writing system for the Chukchi language
- Nikolai Trubetzkoy, principal developer of phonology and inventor of morphophonology, defined phoneme, a founder of the Prague School of structural linguistics
- Dmitry Ushakov, author of the academic Explanatory Dictionary of the Russian Language
- Max Vasmer, leading Indo-European, Finno-Ugric and Turkic etymologist, author of the Etymological dictionary of the Russian language
- Viktor Vinogradov, linguist and philologist, founder of the Russian Language Institute
- Alexander Vostokov, coined the term Old Church Slavonic, discovered Ostromir Gospel (the most ancient East Slavic book), pioneer researcher of the Russian grammar
- Andrey Zaliznyak, author of the comprehensive systematic description of Russian inflection, prominent researcher of the Old Novgorod dialect and birch bark documents, proved the authenticity of the Tale of Igor's Campaign
- L. L. Zamenhof, inventor of Esperanto, the most widely spoken constructed international auxiliary language

== Mathematicians ==
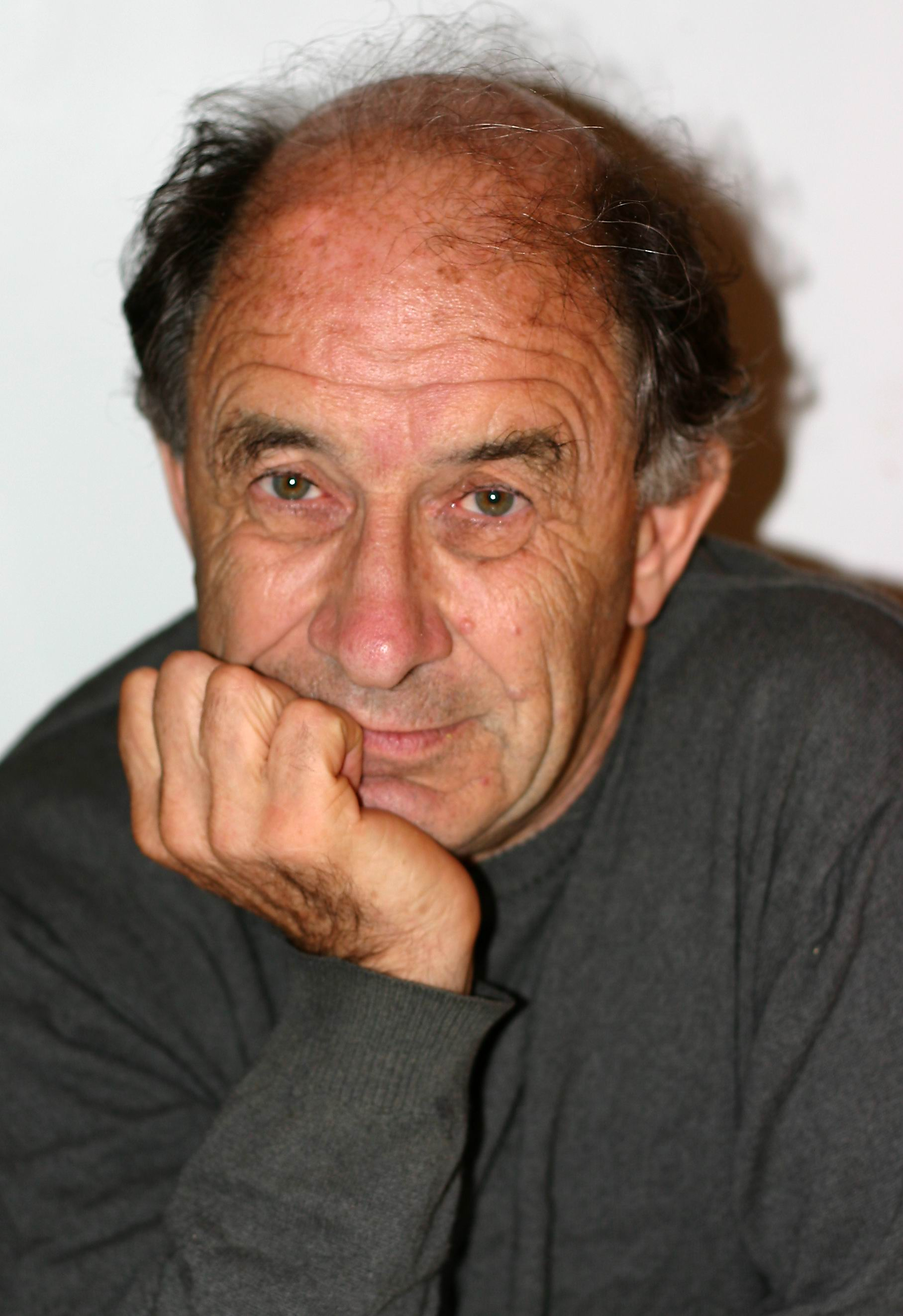
Arnold

- Georgy Adelson-Velsky, inventor of AVL tree algorithm, developer of Kaissa, the first world computer chess champion
- Aleksandr Aleksandrov, developer of CAT(k) space and Alexandrov's uniqueness theorem in geometry
- Pavel Alexandrov, author of the Alexandroff compactification and the Alexandrov topology
- Dmitri Anosov, developed Anosov diffeomorphism
- Vladimir Arnold, an author of the Kolmogorov–Arnold–Moser theorem in dynamical systems, solved Hilbert's 13th problem, raised the ADE classification and Arnold's rouble problems
- Sergey Bernstein, developed the Bernstein polynomial, Bernstein's theorem on monotone functions and Bernstein inequalities in probability theory
- Nikolay Bogolyubov, mathematician and theoretical physicist, author of the edge-of-the-wedge theorem, Krylov–Bogolyubov theorem, describing function and multiple important contributions to quantum mechanics
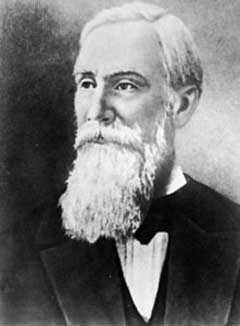
  Chebyshev
- Sergey Chaplygin, author of Chaplygin's equation, important in aerodynamics and notion of Chaplygin gas
- Nikolai Chebotaryov, author of Chebotarev's density theorem
- Pafnuti Chebyshev, prominent tutor and founding father of Russian mathematics, contributed to probability, statistics and number theory, author of the Chebyshev's inequality, Chebyshev distance, Chebyshev function, Chebyshev equation
- Boris Delaunay, inventor of Delaunay triangulation, organised the first Soviet Student Olympiad in mathematics
- Vladimir Drinfeld, mathematician and theoretical physicist, introduced quantum groups and ADHM construction, Fields Medal winner
- Eugene Dynkin, developed Dynkin diagram, Doob–Dynkin lemma and Dynkin system in algebra and probability
- Leonhard Euler, preeminent 18th-century mathematician, arguably the greatest of all time, made important discoveries in mathematical analysis,
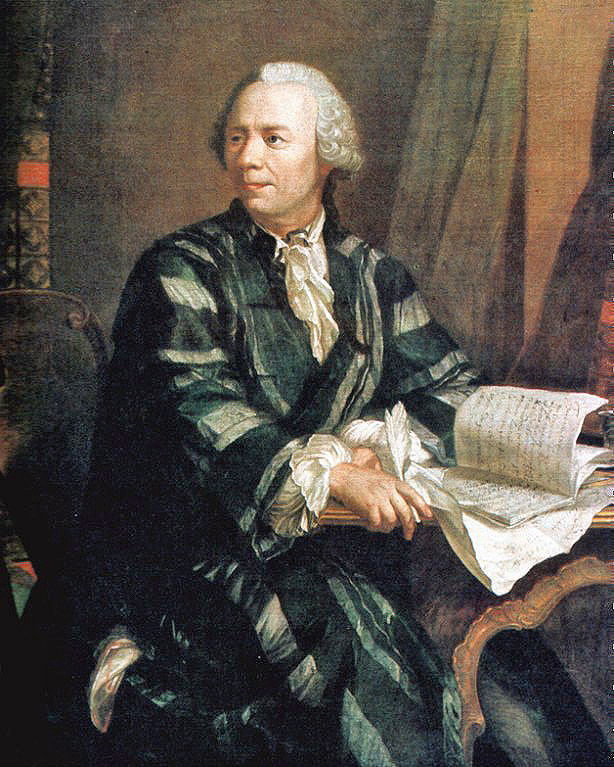
  Euler
  graph theory and number theory, introduced much of the modern mathematical terminology and notation (mathematical function, Euler's number, Euler diagram)
- Anatoly Fomenko, topologist and chronologist, put forth a controversial theory of the New Chronology
- Evgraf Fedorov, mathematician and crystallographer, identified Periodic graph in geometry, the first to catalogue all of the 230 space groups of crystals
- Boris Galerkin, developed the Galerkin method in numerical analysis
- Israel Gelfand, major contributor to numerous areas of mathematics, including group theory, representation theory and linear algebra, author of the Gelfand representation, Gelfand pair, Gelfand triple, integral geometry
- Alexander Gelfond, author of Gelfond's theorem, provided means to obtain infinite number of transcendentals, including Gelfond–Schneider constant and Gelfond's constant, Wolf Prize in Mathematics winner
- Sergei Godunov, developed Godunov's theorem and Godunov's scheme in differential equations
- Valery Goppa, inventor of Goppa codes, and algebraic geometry codes in the field of algebraic geometry
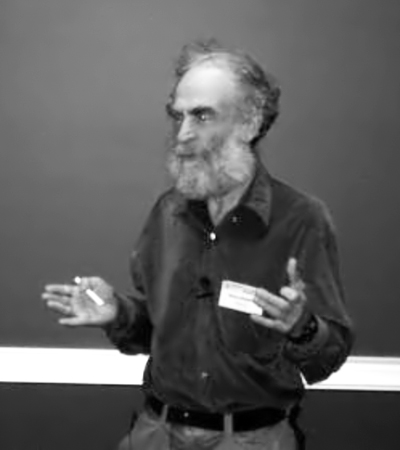
  Gromov
- Mikhail Gromov, a prominent developer of geometric group theory, inventor of homotopy principle, introduced Gromov's compactness theorems, Gromov norm, Gromov product, Wolf Prize winner
- Leonid Kantorovich, mathematician and economist, founded linear programming, introduced the Kantorovich inequality and Kantorovich metric, developed the theory of optimal allocation of resources, Nobel Prize in Economics winner
- Anatoly Karatsuba, developed the Karatsuba algorithm (the first fast multiplication algorithm)
- Leonid Khachiyan, developed the Ellipsoid algorithm for linear programming
- Aleksandr Khinchin, developed the Pollaczek-Khinchine formula, Wiener–Khinchin theorem and Khinchin inequality in probability theory
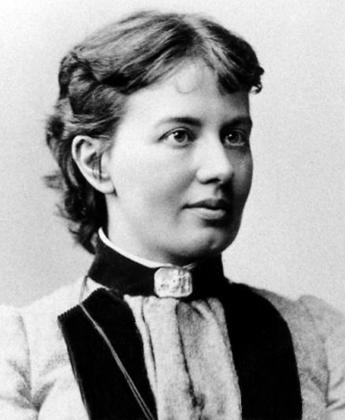
  Kovalevskaya
- Andrey Kolmogorov, a preeminent 20th-century mathematician, Wolf Prize winner; multiple contributions to mathematics include: probability axioms, Chapman–Kolmogorov equation and Kolmogorov extension theorem in probability; Kolmogorov complexity
- Maxim Kontsevich, author of the Kontsevich integral and Kontsevich quantization formula, Fields Medal winner
- Vladimir Kotelnikov, a pioneer in information theory, an author of fundamental sampling theorem
- Sofia Kovalevskaya, the first woman professor in Northern Europe and Russia, the first female professor of mathematics, discovered the Kovalevskaya top
- Mikhail Kravchuk, developed the Kravchuk polynomials and Kravchuk matrix
- Mark Krein, developed the Tannaka–Krein duality, Krein–Milman theorem and Krein space, Wolf Prize winner
- Alexander Kronrod, developer of Gauss–Kronrod quadrature formula and Kaissa, the first world computer chess champion
- Nikolay Krylov, author of the edge-of-the-wedge theorem, Krylov–Bogolyubov theorem and describing function
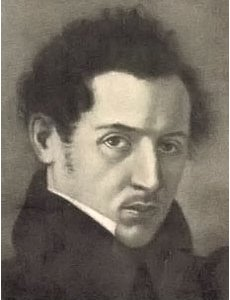
  Lobachevsky
- Aleksandr Kurosh, author of the Kurosh subgroup theorem and Kurosh problem in group theory
- Olga Ladyzhenskaya, made major contributions to solution of Hilbert's 19th problem and important Navier–Stokes equations
- Evgeny Landis, inventor of AVL tree algorithm
- Vladimir Levenshtein, developed the Levenshtein automaton, Levenshtein coding and Levenshtein distance
- Leonid Levin, IT scientist, developed the Cook-Levin theorem
- Yuri Linnik, developed Linnik's theorem in analytic number theory
- Nikolai Lobachevsky, a Copernicus of Geometry who created the first non-Euclidean geometry (Lobachevskian or hyperbolic geometry)
- Nikolai Lusin, developed Luzin's theorem, Luzin spaces and Luzin sets in descriptive set theory
- Aleksandr Lyapunov, founder of stability theory, author of the Lyapunov's central limit theorem, Lyapunov equation, Lyapunov fractal, Lyapunov time
- Leonty Magnitsky, a director of the Moscow School of Mathematics and Navigation, author of the principal Russian 18th-century textbook in mathematics
- Anatoly Maltsev, researched decidability of various algebraic groups,
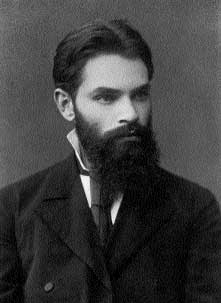
  Lyapunov
  developed the Malcev algebra
- Yuri Manin, author of the Gauss–Manin connection in algebraic geometry, Manin-Mumford conjecture and Manin obstruction in diophantine geometry
- Grigory Margulis, worked on lattices in Lie groups, Wolf Prize and Fields Medal winner
- Andrey Markov Sr., invented the Markov chains, proved Markov brothers' inequality, author of the hidden Markov model, Markov number, Markov property, Markov's inequality, Markov processes, Markov random field, Markov algorithm
- Andrey Markov Jr., author of Markov's principle and Markov's rule in logics
- Yuri Matiyasevich, author of Matiyasevich's theorem in set theory, provided negative solution for Hilbert's tenth problem
- Alexander Mikhailov, coined the term Informatics

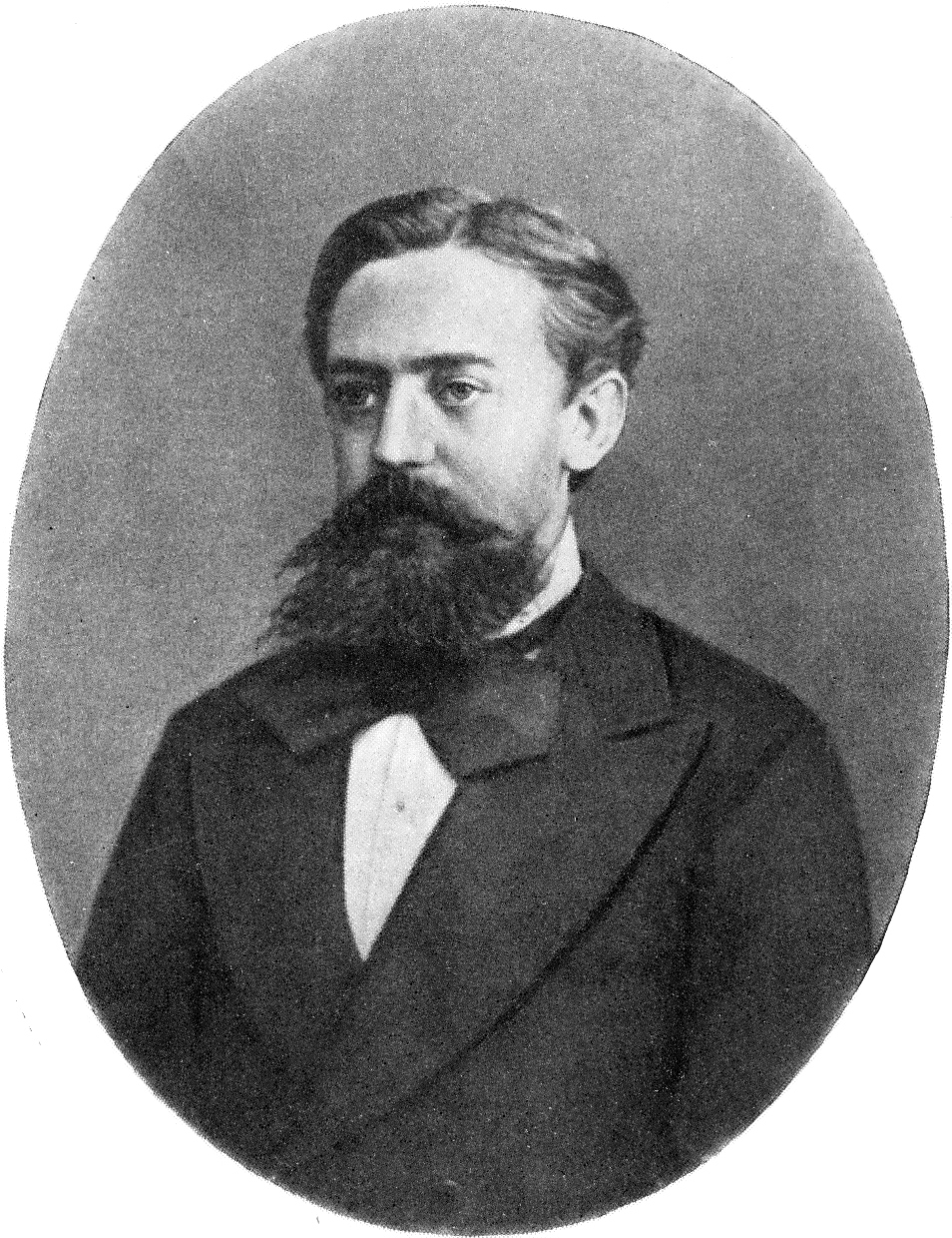
Markov Sr.

- Mark Naimark, author of the Gelfand–Naimark theorem and Naimark's problem
- Pyotr Novikov, solved the word problem for groups and Burnside's problem
- Sergei Novikov, worked on algebraic topology and soliton theory, developed Adams–Novikov spectral sequence and Novikov conjecture, Wolf Prize and Fields Medal winner
- Andrei Okounkov, infinite symmetric groups and Hilbert scheme researcher, Fields Medal winner
- Mikhail Ostrogradsky, mathematician and physicist, author of divergence theorem and partial fractions in integration
- Grigori Perelman, made landmark contributions to Riemannian geometry and topology, proved Geometrization conjecture
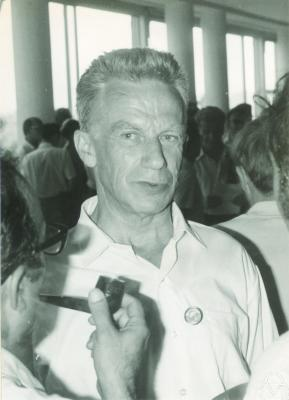
  Sobolev
  and Poincaré conjecture, won a Fields Medal and the first Clay Millennium Prize Problems Award (declined both)
- Lev Pontryagin, blind mathematician, developed Pontryagin duality and Pontryagin classes in topology, and Pontryagin's minimum principle in optimal control
- Yury Prokhorov, author of the Lévy–Prokhorov metric and Prokhorov's theorem in probability
- Alexander Razborov, mathematician and computational theorist who won the Nevanlinna Prize in 1990 and the Gödel Prize for contributions to computer sciences
- Lev Schnirelmann, developed the Lusternik–Schnirelmann category in topology and Schnirelmann density of numbers
- Moses Schönfinkel, inventor of combinatory logic
- Yakov Sinai, developed the Kolmogorov–Sinai entropy and Sinai billiard, Wolf Prize and Abel Prize winner
- Eugen Slutsky, statistician and economist, developed the Slutsky equation and Slutsky's theorem
- Stanislav Smirnov, prominent researcher of triangular lattice, Fields Medalist
- Sergei Sobolev, introduced the Sobolev spaces and mathematical distributions, co-developer of the first ternary computer Setun
- Vladimir Steklov, mathematician and physicist, founder of Steklov Institute of Mathematics, proved theorems on generalized Fourier series
- Jakow Trachtenberg, developed the Trachtenberg system of mental calculation
- Boris Trakhtenbrot, proved the Gap theorem, developed Trakhtenbrot's theorem
- Valentin Turchin, inventor of Refal programming language, introduced metasystem transition and supercompilation
- Andrey Tikhonov, author of Tikhonov space and Tikhonov's theorem (central in general topology), the Tikhonov regularization of ill-posed problems, invented magnetotellurics
- Pavel Urysohn, developed the metrization theorems, Urysohn's Lemma and Fréchet–Urysohn space in topology
- Nicolay Vasilyev, inventor of non-Aristotelian logic, the forerunner of paraconsistent and multi-valued logics
- Ivan Vinogradov, developed Vinogradov's theorem and Pólya–Vinogradov inequality in analytic number theory
- Vladimir Voevodsky, introduced a homotopy theory for schemes and modern motivic cohomology, Fields Medalist
- Georgy Voronoy, invented the Voronoi diagram
- Dmitry Yegorov, author of Egorov's Theorem in mathematical analysis
- Efim Zelmanov, solved the restricted Burnside problem, Fields Medal winner

== Astronomers and cosmologists ==
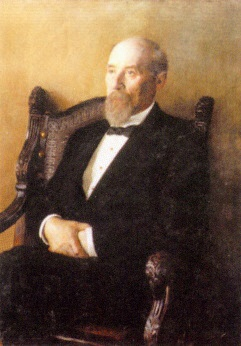
Bredikhin

- Viktor Ambartsumian, one of the founders of theoretical astrophysics, discoverer of stellar associations, founder of Byurakan Observatory in Armenia
- Vladimir Belinski, an author of the BKL singularity model of the Universe evolution
- Aristarkh Belopolsky, invented a spectrograph based on the Doppler effect, among the first photographers of stellar spectra
- Fyodor Bredikhin, developed the theory of comet tails, meteors and meteor showers, a director of the Pulkovo Observatory
- Jacob Bruce, statesman, naturalist and astronomer, founder of the first observatory in Russia (in the Sukharev Tower)
- Lyudmila Chernykh, astronomer, discovered 268 asteroids
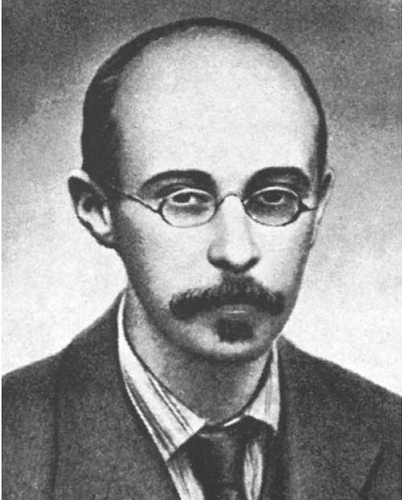
  Friedmann
- Nikolai Chernykh, astronomer, discovered 537 asteroids and 2 comets
- Aleksandr Chudakov, co-discoverer of the Earth's radiation belt
- Alexander Friedmann, mathematician and cosmologist, discovered the expanding-universe solution to the general relativity field equations, an author of the FLRW metric of Universe
- George Gamow, theoretical physicist and cosmologist, discovered alpha decay via quantum tunneling and Gamow factor in stellar nucleosynthesis, introduced the Big Bang nucleosynthesis theory, predicted cosmic microwave background
- Matvey Gusev, the first to prove the non-sphericity of the Moon, pioneer of photography in astronomy
- Nikolai Kardashev, astrophysicist, inventor of Kardashev scale for ranking the space civilizations
- Isaak Khalatnikov, an author of the BKL singularity model of the Universe evolution
- Marian Kowalski, the first to measure the rotation of the Milky Way
- Feodosy Krasovsky, astronomer and geodesist, measured the Krasovsky ellipsoid, a coordinate system used in the USSR and the post-Soviet states
- Anders Johan Lexell, astronomer and mathematician, researcher of celestial mechanics and comet astronomy, proved that Uranus is a planet rather than a comet
- Evgeny Lifshitz, an author of the BKL singularity model of the Universe's evolution
- Andrei Linde, created the Universe chaotic inflation theory
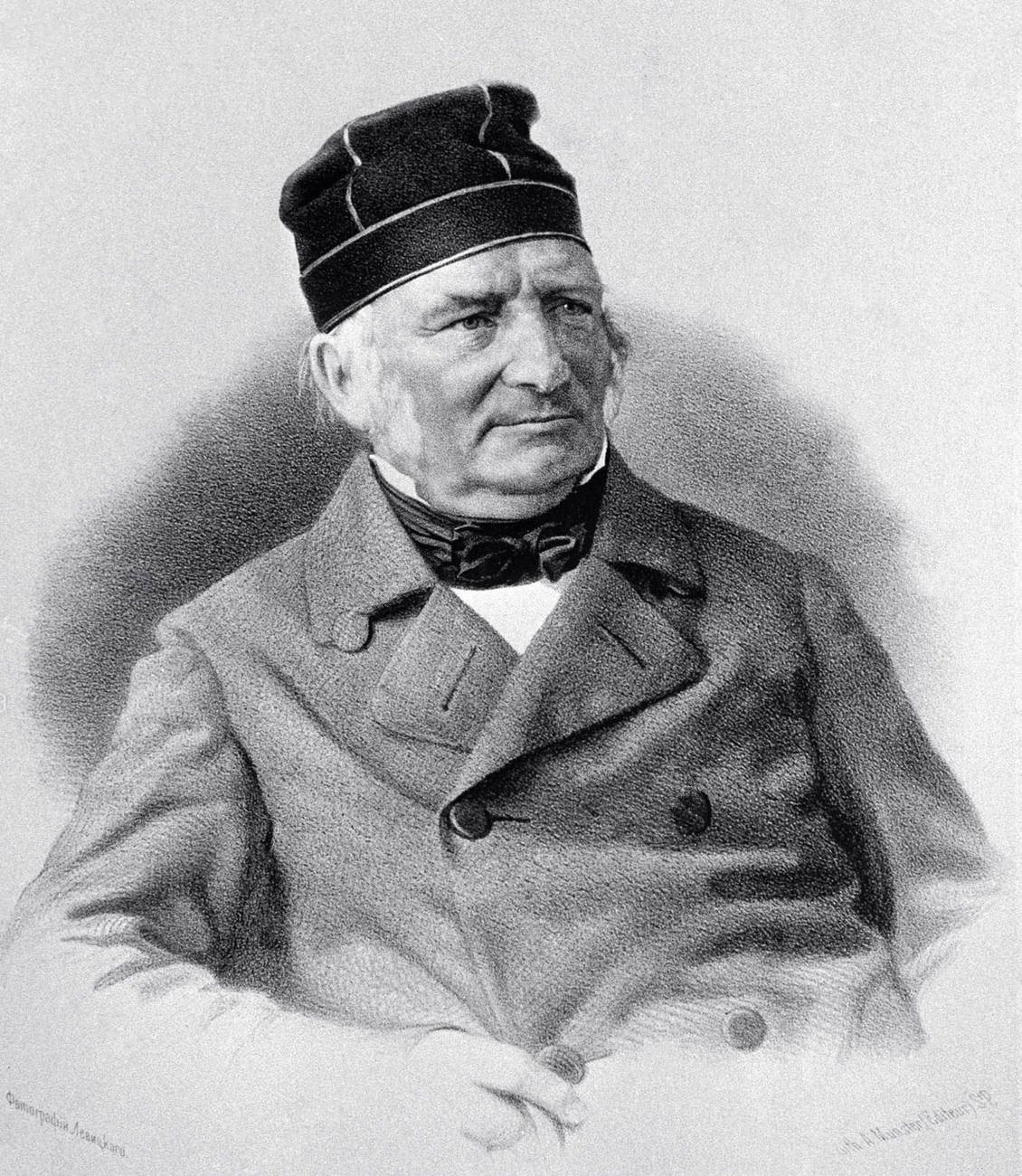
  F.W. Struve
- Mikhail Lomonosov polymath, inventor of the off-axis reflecting telescope, discoverer of the atmosphere of Venus
- Dmitri Dmitrievich Maksutov, inventor of the Maksutov telescope
- Igor Novikov, theoretical astrophysicist and cosmologist, formulated the Novikov self-consistency principle in the theory of time travel
- Viktor Safronov, astronomer and cosmologist, author of the planetesimal hypothesis of planet formation
- Grigory Shayn, astronomer and astrophysicist, the first director of the Crimean Astrophysical Observatory, co-developed a method for measurement of stellar rotation

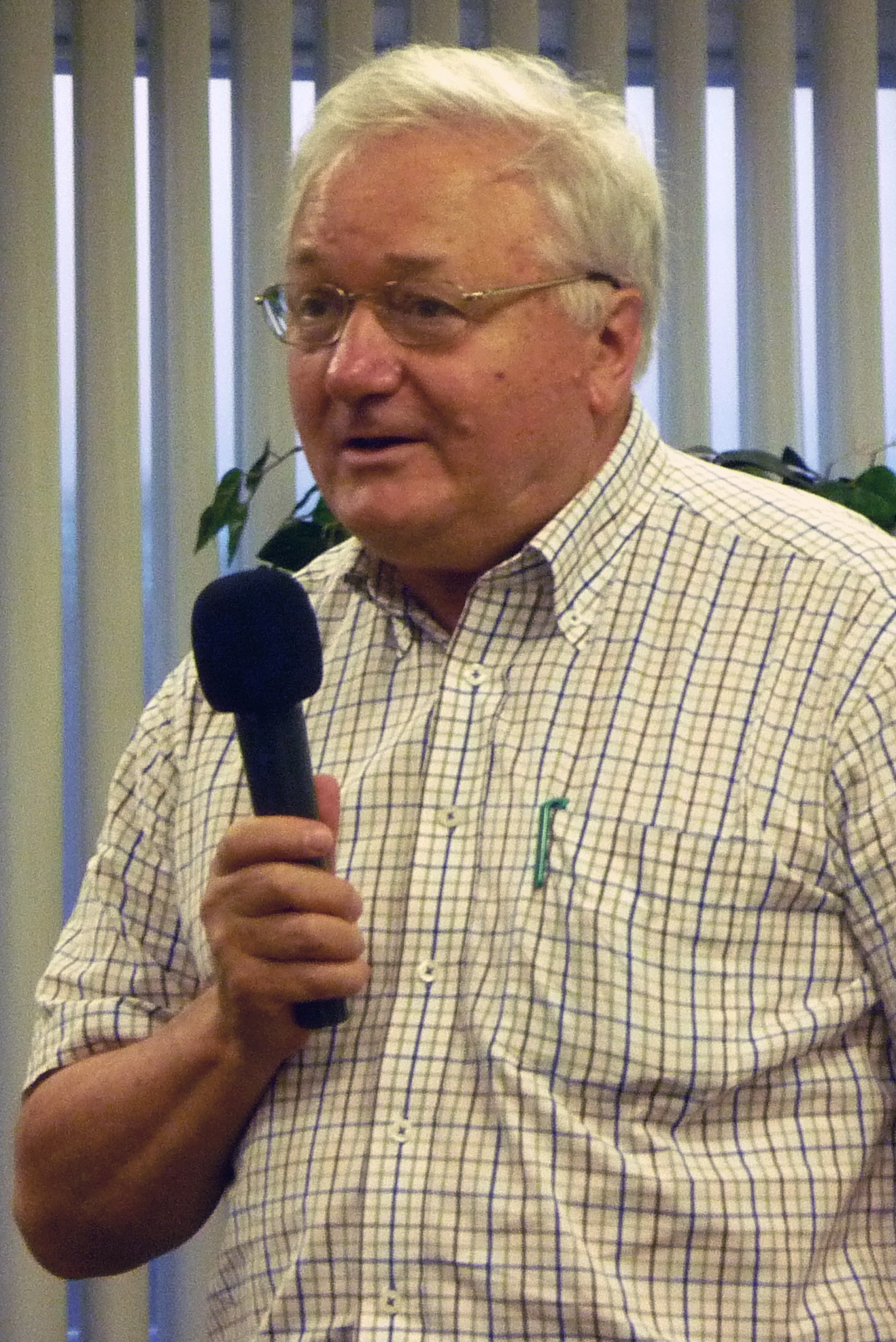
Sunyaev

- Iosif Shklovsky, astronomer and astrophysicist, author of several discoveries in the fields of radio astronomy and cosmic rays, extraterrestrial life researcher
- Friedrich Wilhelm Struve, astronomer and geodesist, founder and the first director of the Pulkovo Observatory, prominent researcher and discoverer of new double stars, initiated the construction of 2,820 km long Struve Geodetic Arc, progenitor of the Struve family of astronomers
- Otto Lyudvigovich Struve, astronomer and astrophysicist, co-developed a method for measurement of stellar rotation, directed several observatories in the US
- Otto Wilhelm von Struve, astronomer, director of the Pulkovo Observatory, discovered over 500 double stars
- Rashid Sunyaev, astrophysicist, co-predicted the Sunyaev–Zel'dovich effect of CMB distortion
- George Volkoff, predicted the existence of neutron stars
- Boris Vorontsov-Velyaminov, discovered the absorption of light by interstellar dust, author of the Morphological Catalogue of Galaxies
- Ivan Yarkovsky, discovered the YORP and Yarkovsky effects of meteoroids or asteroids
- Aleksandr Zaitsev, coined the term Messaging to Extra-Terrestrial Intelligence, conducted the first intercontinental radar astronomy experiment, transmitted the Cosmic Calls
- Yakov Zel'dovich, physicist, astrophysicist and cosmologist, the first to suggest that accretion discs around massive black holes are responsible for the quasar radiation, co-predicted the Sunyaev–Zel'dovich effect of CMB distortion
- Felix Ziegel, Soviet researcher, Doctor of Science and docent of Cosmology at the Moscow Aviation Institute, author of more than 40 popular books on astronomy and space exploration, generally regarded as a founder of Russian ufology

== Physicists ==
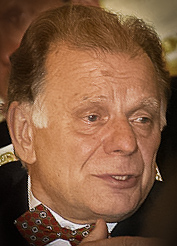
Alferov

- Alexei Abrikosov, discovered how magnetic flux can penetrate a superconductor (the Abrikosov vortex), Nobel Prize winner
- Artem Alikhanian, a prominent researcher of cosmic rays, inventor of wide-gap track spark chamber
- Franz Aepinus, related electricity and magnetism, proved the electric nature of pyroelectricity, explained electric polarization and electrostatic induction, invented achromatic microscope
- Abraham Alikhanov, a prominent researcher of cosmic rays, built the first nuclear reactors in the USSR, founder of Institute for Theoretical and Experimental Physics (ITEP)
- Zhores Alferov, inventor of modern heterotransistor, Nobel Prize winner
- Semen Altshuler, researched EPR and NMR, predicted acoustic paramagnetic resonance
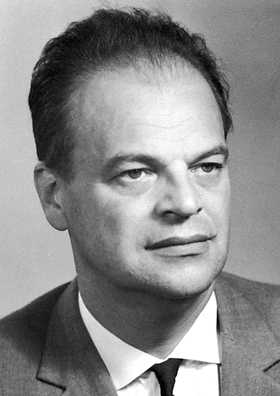
  Basov
- Lev Artsimovich, builder of the first tokamak, researcher of high temperature plasma
- Gurgen Askaryan, predicted self focusing of light, discovered Askaryan effect in particle physics
- Nikolay Basov, physicist, co-inventor of laser and maser, Nobel Prize winner
- Nikolay Bogolyubov, mathematician and theoretical physicist, co-developed the BBGKY hierarchy, formulated a microscopic theory of superconductivity, suggested a triplet quark model, introduced a new quantum degree of freedom (color charge)
- Gersh Budker, inventor of electron cooling, co-inventor of collider
- Sergey Chaplygin, a founder of aero- and hydrodynamics, formulated the Chaplygin's equations and Chaplygin gas concept
- Pavel Cherenkov, discoverer of Cherenkov radiation, Nobel Prize winner
- Yuri Denisyuk, inventor of 3D holography
- Ludvig Faddeev, discoverer of Faddeev–Popov ghosts and Faddeev equations in quantum physics
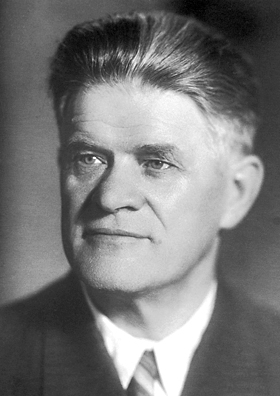
  Cherenkov
- Georgy Flyorov, nuclear physicist, one of the initiators of the Soviet atomic bomb project, co-discoverer of seaborgium and bohrium, founder of the Joint Institute for Nuclear Research
- Vladimir Fock, developed the Fock space, Fock state and the Hartree–Fock method in quantum mechanics
- Ilya Frank, explained the phenomenon of Cherenkov radiation, Nobel Prize winner
- Vsevolod Frederiks (Fréedericksz), discovered the Fréedericksz transition, the Fréedericksz critical field in liquid crystals
- Yakov Frenkel, introduced the notion of electron hole, discovered the Frenkel defect of a crystal lattice, described the Poole–Frenkel effect in solid-state physics
- George Gamow, explained alpha decay as quantum tunneling, developed theories of the Big Bang, nucleosynthesis and offered explanation of foundations of molecular genetics
- Andre Geim, inventor of graphene, developer of gecko tape, Nobel Prize winner and at the same time Ig Nobel Prize winner for diamagnetic levitation of a living frog
- Vitaly Ginzburg, co-author of the Ginzburg–Landau theory of superconductivity, a developer of hydrogen bomb, Nobel Prize winner
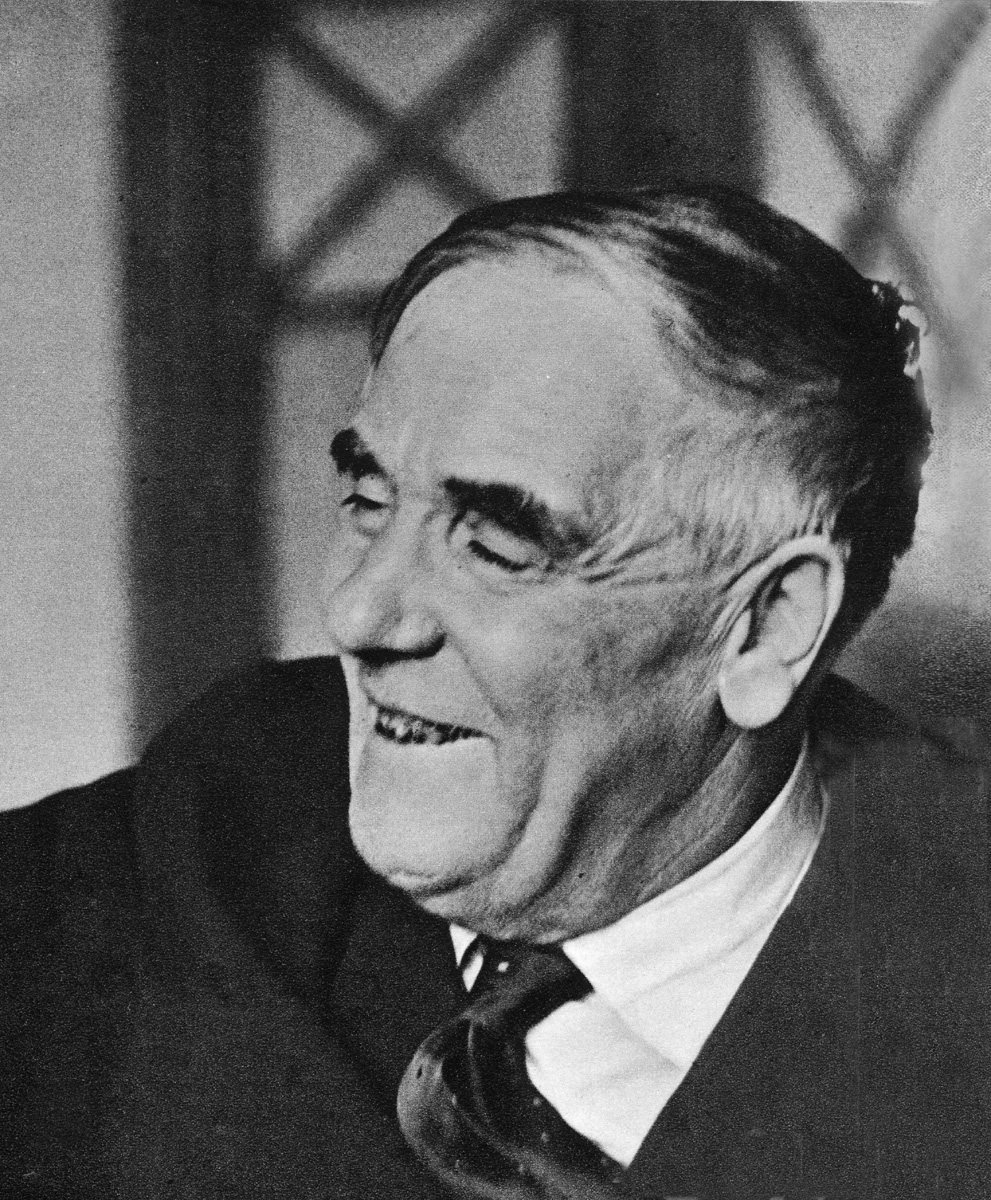
  Kapitsa
- Vladimir Gribov, introduced pomeron, DGLAP equations and Gribov ambiguity
- Aleksandr Gurevich, author of the runaway breakdown theory of lightning
- Abram Ioffe, founder of the Soviet physics school, tutor of many prominent scientists
- Dmitri Ivanenko, proposed the first models of nuclear shell and exchange of nuclear forces, predicted the synchrotron radiation, the author of the hypothesis of quark stars
- Boris Jacobi, formulated the Maximum power theorem in electrical engineering, invented electroplating, electrotyping, galvanoplastic sculpture and electric boat
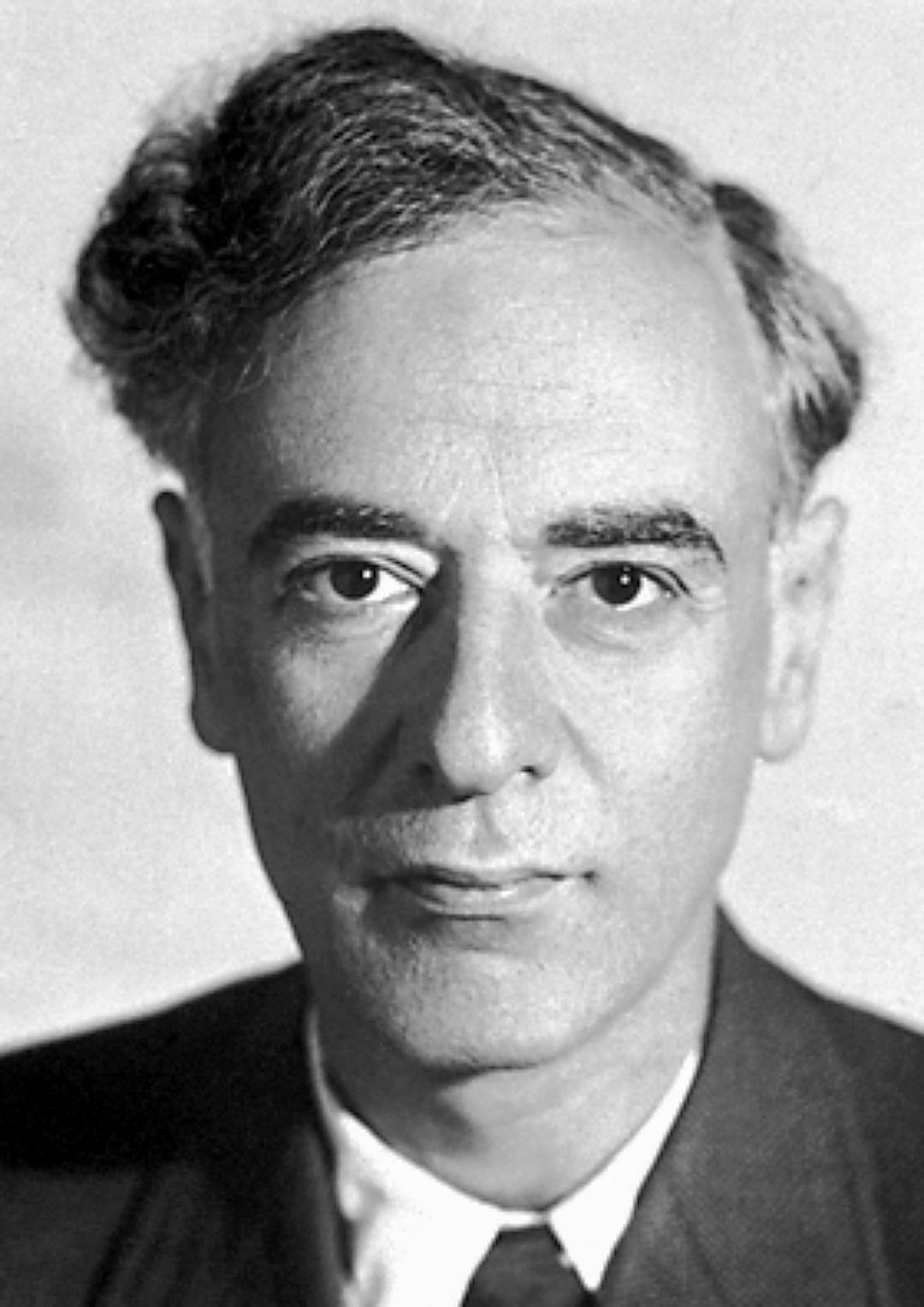
  Landau
- Pyotr Kapitsa, originated the techniques for creating ultrastrong magnetic fields, co-discovered a way to measure the magnetic field of an atomic nucleus discovered superfluidity, Nobel Prize winner
- Yuly Khariton, chief designer of the Soviet atomic bomb, co-developer of the Tsar Bomb
- Orest Khvolson, the first to study the Chwolson ring effect of gravitational lensing
- Sergey Krasnikov, developer of the Krasnikov tube, a speculative mechanism for space travel
- Igor Kurchatov, builder of the first nuclear power plant, developer of the first nuclear reactors for surface ships
- Dmitry Lachinov, physicist, electrical engineer, inventor, meteorologist and climatologist
- Lev Landau, theoretical physicist, developed the Ginzburg–Landau theory of superconductivity, explained the Landau damping in plasma physics, pointed out the Landau pole in quantum electrodynamics, co-author of the famous Course of Theoretical Physics, Nobel Prize winner
- Grigory Landsberg, co-discoverer of Raman scattering of light
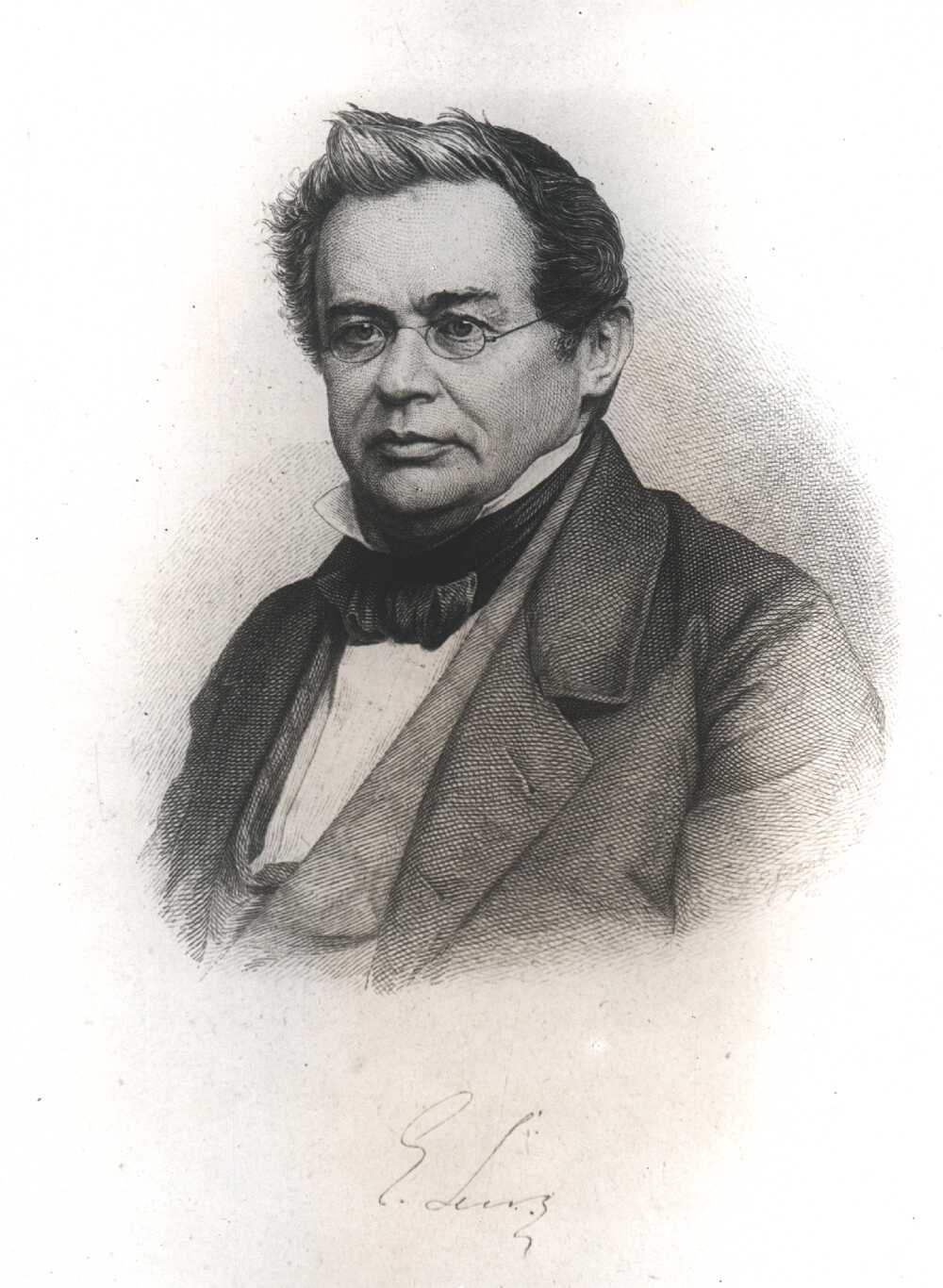
  Lenz
- Mikhail Lavrentyev, physicist and mathematician, founded the Siberian Division of the Soviet Academy of Sciences and Akademgorodok in Novosibirsk
- Pyotr Lebedev, the first to measure the radiation pressure on a solid body, thus privoving the Maxwell's theory of electromagnetism
- Heinrich Lenz, discovered the Lenz's law of electromagnetism
- Evgeny Lifshitz, an author of the BKL singularity model of the Universe evolution, co-author of the famous Course of Theoretical Physics
- Mikhail Lomonosov, polymath scientist, artist and inventor, proposed the law of conservation of matter, disproved the phlogiston theory
- Oleg Losev, inventor of light-emitting diode and crystadine
- Alexander Makarov, inventor of orbitrap
- Boris Mamyrin, inventor of reflectron
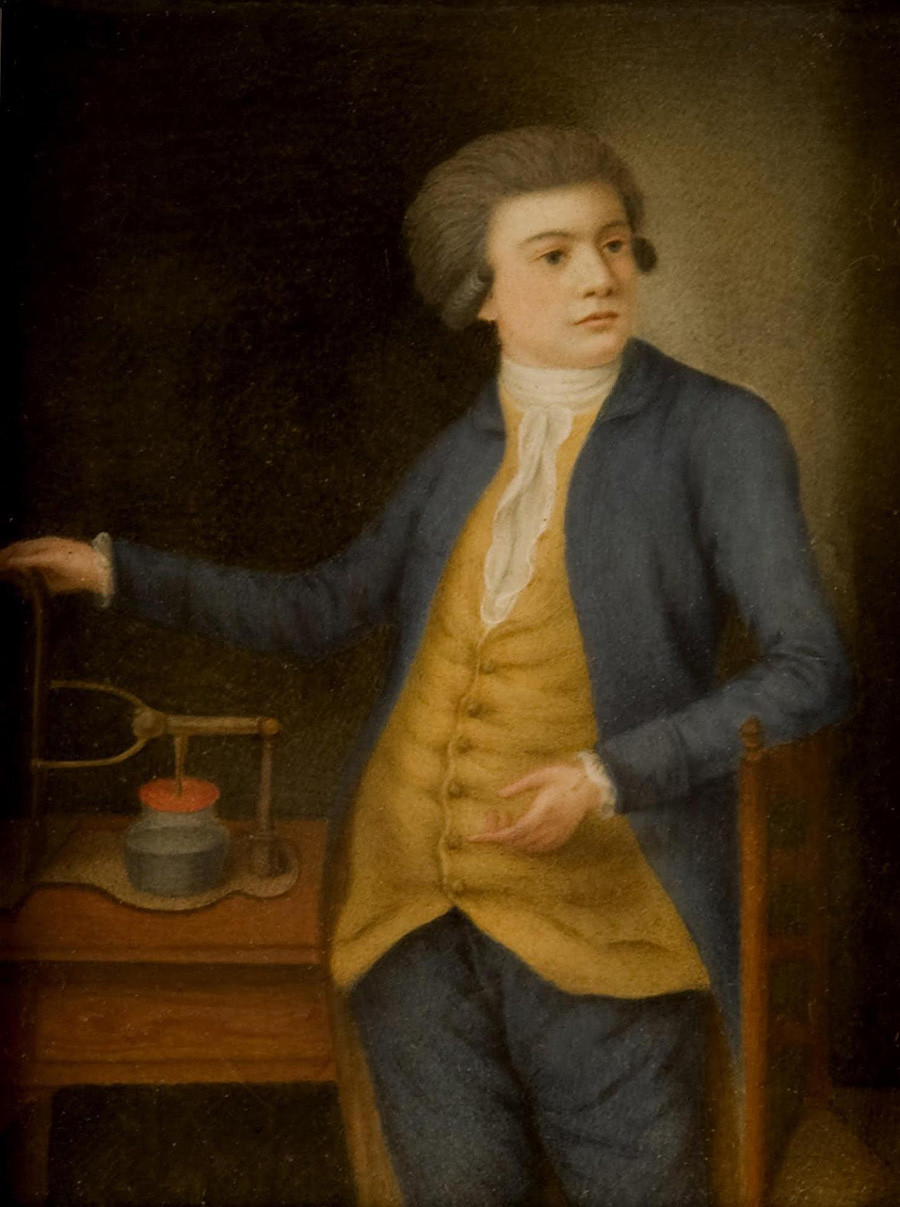
  Petrov
- Leonid Mandelshtam, co-discoverer of Raman effect
- Stanislav Mikheyev, co-discoverer of Mikheyev–Smirnov–Wolfenstein effect of neutrino oscillations
- Konstantin Novoselov, inventor of graphene, developer of gecko tape, Nobel Prize winner
- Yuri Oganessian, nuclear physicist of the Joint Institute for Nuclear Research (JINR), co-discoverer of the heaviest elements in the periodic table; element Oganesson
- Vasily Petrov, discoverer of electric arc, proposed arc lamp and arc welding
- Boris Podolsky, an author of EPR Paradox in quantum physics
- Alexander Polyakov, developed the concepts of Polyakov action, 't Hooft–Polyakov monopole and BPST instanton
- Isaak Pomeranchuk, predicted synchrotron radiation
- Bruno Pontecorvo, a founder of neutrino high energy physics, his work led to the discovery of PMNS matrix
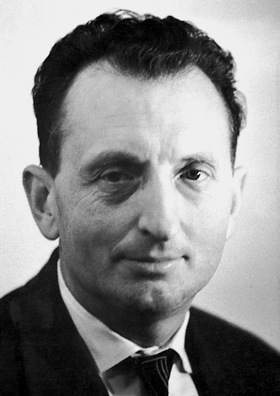
  Prokhorov
- Alexander Popov, inventor of lightning detector, one of the inventors of radio, recorded the first experimental radiolocation at sea
- Victor Popov, co-discoverer of Faddeev–Popov ghosts in quantum field theory
- Alexander Prokhorov, co-inventor of laser and maser, Nobel Prize winner
- Georg Wilhelm Richmann, inventor of electrometer, pioneer researcher of atmospheric electricity, killed by a ball lightning in experiment
- Andrei Sakharov, co-developer of tokamak and the Tsar Bomb, inventor of explosively pumped flux compression generator, Nobel Peace Prize winner
- Nikolay Semyonov, physical chemist, co-discovered a way to measure the magnetic field of an atomic nucleus, Nobel Prize in Chemistry winner
- Lev Shubnikov, discoverer of Shubnikov–de Haas effect, one of the first researchers of solid hydrogen and liquid helium
- Dmitri Skobeltsyn, the first to use cloud chamber for studying cosmic rays, the first to observe positrons
- Alexei Smirnov, co-discoverer of Mikheyev–Smirnov–Wolfenstein effect of neutrino oscillations
- Arseny Sokolov, co-discoverer of Sokolov–Ternov effect, a developer of synchrotron radiation theory
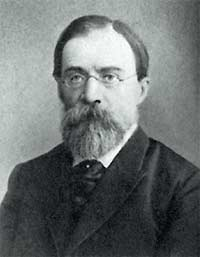
  Stoletov
- Igor Tamm, explained the phenomenon of Cherenkov radiation, co-developer of tokamak, Nobel Prize winner
- Aleksandr Stoletov, inventor of photoelectric cell, built the Stoletov curve and pioneered the research of ferromagnetism
- Igor Ternov, co-discoverer of Sokolov–Ternov effect of synchrotron radiation
- Nikolay Umov, discovered the Umov–Poynting vector and Umov effect, the first to propose the formula $E=kmc^2$
- Petr Ufimtsev, developed the theory that led to modern stealth technology
- Sergey Vavilov, co-discoverer of Cherenkov radiation, formulated the Kasha–Vavilov rule of quantum yields
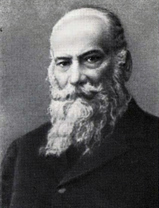
  Zhukovsky
- Vladimir Veksler, inventor of synchrophasotron, co-inventor of synchrotron
- Evgeny Velikhov, leader of the international program ITER (thermonuclear experimental tokamak)
- Anatoly Vlasov, developed the Vlasov equation in plasma physics
- Alexey Yekimov, discoverer of quantum dots
- Yevgeny Zavoisky, inventor of EPR spectroscopy, co-developer of NMR spectroscopy
- Yakov Zel'dovich, physicist and cosmologist, predicted the beta decay of a pi meson and the muon catalysis, co-predicted the Sunyaev–Zel'dovich effect of CMB distortion
- Nikolai Zhukovsky, a founder of aero- and hydrodynamics, the first to study airflow, author of Joukowsky transform and Kutta–Joukowski theorem, founder of TsAGI and pioneer of aviation
- Octiabr' Emelianenko, did fundamental work in physics of III-V compound semiconductors.

== Chemists and material scientists ==
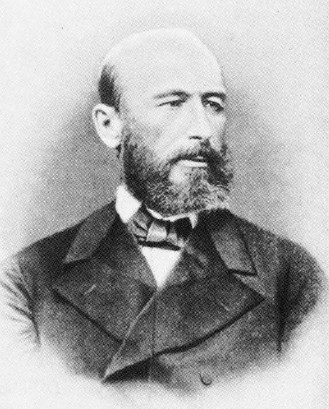
Butlerov

- Alexander Baykov, metallurgist and academician of the USSR Academy of Sciences.
- Ernest Beaux, inventor of Chanel No. 5, "the world's most legendary fragrance"
- Nikolay Beketov, inventor of aluminothermy, a founder of physical chemistry
- Friedrich Konrad Beilstein, proposed the Beilstein test for the detection of halogens, author of the Beilstein database in organic chemistry
- Boris Belousov, chemist and biophysicist, discoverer of Belousov–Zhabotinsky reaction, a classical example of non-equilibrium thermodynamics
- Alexander Borodin, chemist and composer, the author of the famous opera Prince Igor, discovered Borodin reaction, co-discovered Aldol reaction
- Aleksandr Butlerov, discovered hexamine, formaldehyde and formose reaction (the first synthesis of sugar), the first to incorporate double bonds into structural formulae, a founder of organic chemistry and the theory of chemical structure
- Dmitry Chernov, founder of modern metallography, discovered polymorphism in metals, built the iron-carbon phase diagram
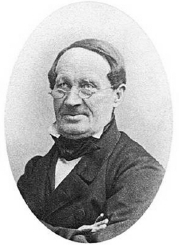
  Claus
- Aleksei Chichibabin, discovered Chichibabin pyridine synthesis, Bodroux-Chichibabin aldehyde synthesis and Chichibabin reaction
- Lev Chugaev, discoverer of Chugaev elimination in organic chemistry
- Karl Ernst Claus, chemist and botanist, discoverer of ruthenium
- Nikolay Demyanov, discoverer of Demjanov rearrangement in organic chemistry
- Aleksandr Dianin, discoverer of Bisphenol A and Dianin's compound
- Constantin Fahlberg, inventor of saccharin, the first artificial sweetener
- Alexey Favorsky, discoverer of Favorskii rearrangement and Favorskii reaction in organic chemistry
- Alexander Frumkin, a founder of modern electrochemistry, author of the theory of electrode reactions
- Evgraf Fedorov, the first to enumerate all of the 230 space groups of crystals, thus founding the modern crystallography
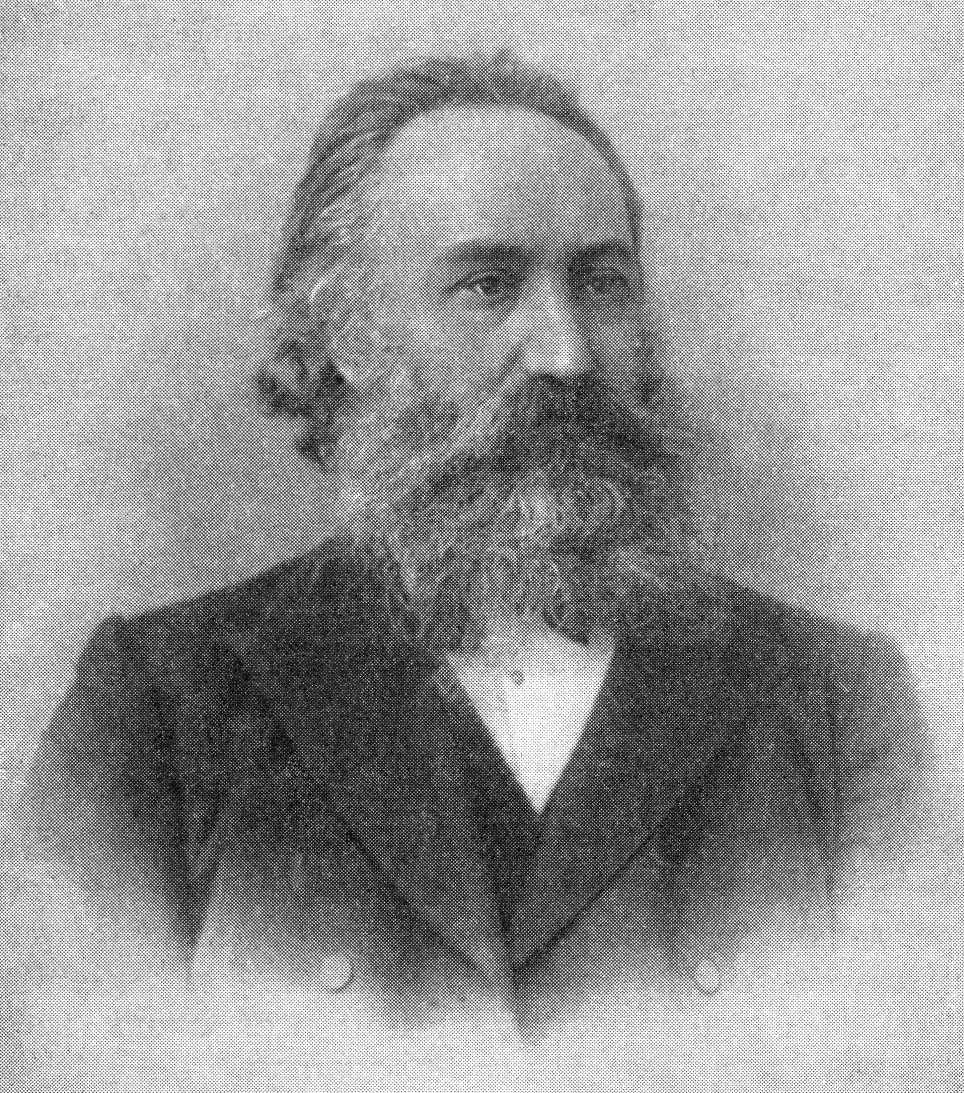
  Fedorov
- Andre Geim, inventor of graphene, developer of gecko tape, Nobel Prize in Physics winner
- Igor Gorynin, inventor of weldable titanium alloys, high strength aluminium alloys, and many radiation-hardened steels
- Vladimir Ipatieff, inventor of Ipatieff bomb, a founder of petrochemistry
- Isidore, legendary inventor of the Russian vodka
- Boris Jacobi, re-discovered electroplating and initiated its practical usage
- Pyotr Kapitsa, discovered superfluidity while studying liquid helium, Nobel Prize in Physics winner
- Morris Kharasch, inventor of anti-microbial compound thimerosal
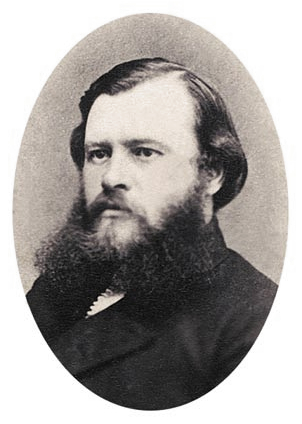
  Markovnikov
- Gottlieb Kirchhoff, discoverer of glucose
- Ivan Knunyants, inventor of poly-caprolactam, founder of Soviet school of fluorocarbon's chemistry, a developer of Soviet chemical weapons
- Sergei Lebedev, inventor of polybutadiene, the first commercially viable synthetic rubber
- Mikhail Lomonosov, polymath, coined the term physical chemistry, re-discovered smalt, proved that the phlogiston theory was false, the first to record the freezing of mercury
- Aleksandr Loran, inventor of fire fighting foam
- Konstantin Novoselov, inventor of graphene, developer of gecko tape, Nobel Prize in Physics winner
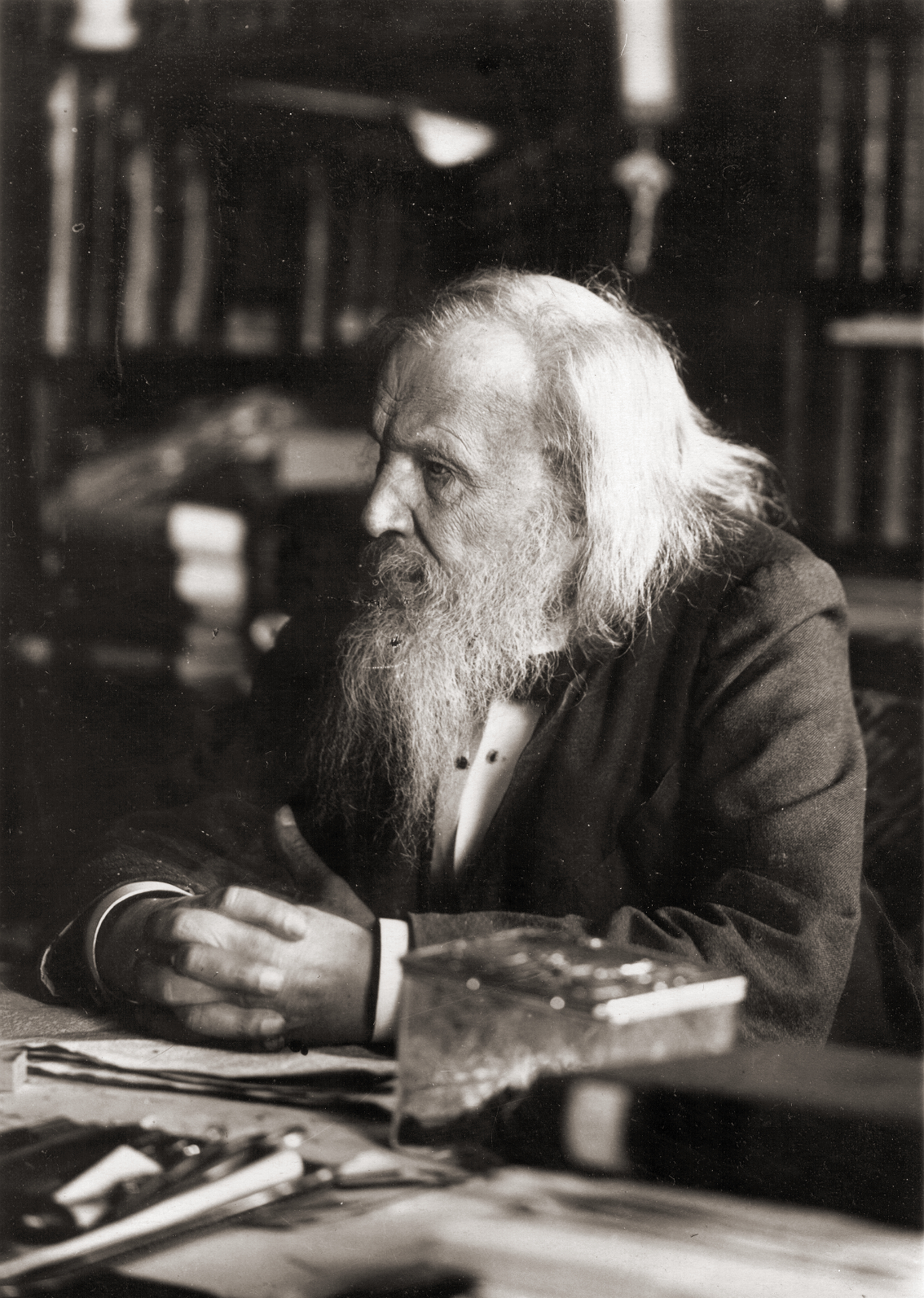
  Mendeleev
- Vladimir Markovnikov, author of the Markovnikov's rule in organic chemistry, discoverer of naphthenes
- Mikhail Davidovich Mashkovsky, pharmacologist, author of the pharmacopoeia "Medical compounds"
- Dmitri Mendeleyev, invented the Periodic table of chemical elements, the first to predict the properties of elements yet to be discovered, invented pyrocollodion, developer of pipelines and a prominent researcher of vodka
- Nikolai Menshutkin, discoverer of Menshutkin reaction in organic chemistry
- Sergey Namyotkin, a prominent researcher of terpenes, discoverer of Nametkin rearrangement
- Ilya Prigogine, researcher of dissipative structures,
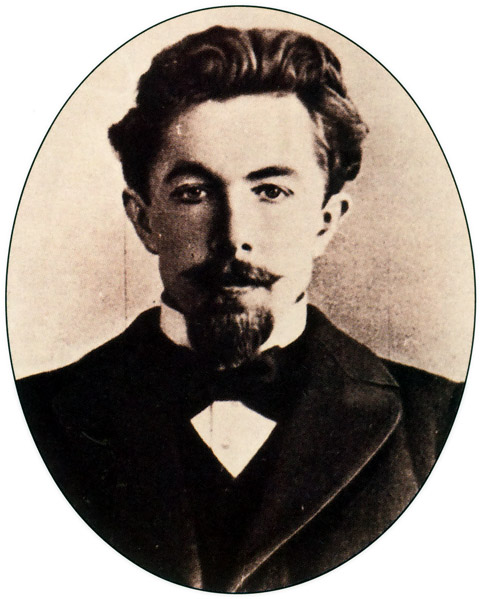
  Tsvet
  complex systems and irreversibility, Nobel Prize winner
- Sergey Reformatsky, discoverer of Reformatsky reaction in organic chemistry
- Nikolay Semyonov, physical chemist, author of the chain reaction theory, Nobel Prize winner
- Carl Schmidt, analyzed the crystal structure of many biochemicals, proved that animal and plant cells are chemically similar
- Vladimir Shukhov, polymath, inventor of chemical cracking
- Mikhail Shultz, physical chemist and artist; one of the creators the glass electrode theory; author of several thermodynamic methods
- Mikhail Tsvet, botanist, inventor of chromatography
- Victor Veselago, the first researcher of materials with negative permittivity and permeability
- Paul Walden, discovered the Walden inversion and ethylammonium nitrate, the first room temperature ionic liquid
- Alexander Zaytsev, author of the Zaitsev's rule in organic chemistry
- Nikolay Zelinsky, inventor of activated charcoal gas mask in Europe during World War I, co-discoverer of Hell-Volhard-Zelinsky halogenation, a founder of petrochemistry
- Nikolai Zinin, discovered benzidine, co-discovered aniline, the first President of the Russian Physical-Chemical Society
- Anatol Zhabotinsky, discoverer of Belousov–Zhabotinsky reaction, a classical example of non-equilibrium thermodynamics

== Structural engineers ==
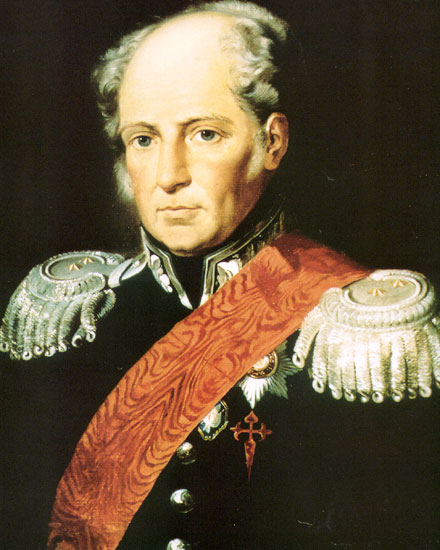
Betancourt

- Nikolai Belelubsky, major bridge designer, invented a number of construction schemes
- Agustín de Betancourt, polymath-engineer and urban planner, designed the Moscow Manege and the giant cast iron dome of St. Isaac's Cathedral, founded Goznak
- Vladimir Barmin, designer of the world's first rocket launch complex (Baikonur Cosmodrome)
- Akinfiy Demidov, builder of the Leaning Tower of Nevyansk, the first structure to employ rebars and cast iron cupola, as well as the first lightning rod in the Western world
- Alexey Dushkin, designer of the first deep column station, Mayakovskaya
- Alexander Hrennikoff, founder of the finite element method

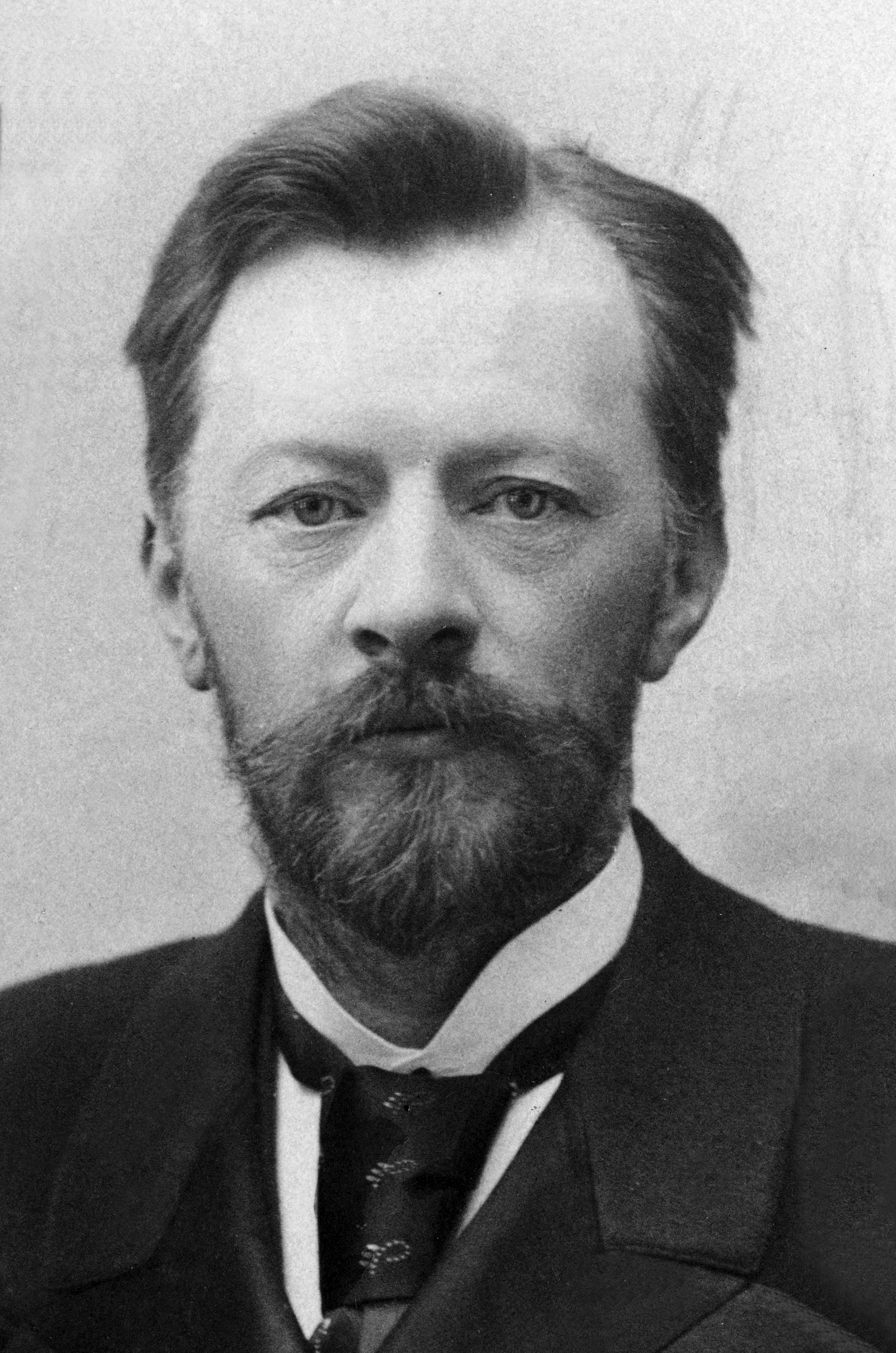
Shukhov

- Nikolai Nikitin, engineer of the largest Soviet structures: Moscow State University, Luzhniki Stadium, The Motherland Calls and Ostankino Tower (once the world's tallest freestanding structure)
- Lavr Proskuryakov, builder of multiple bridges along the Trans-Siberian Railway, inventor and tutor
- Vladimir Shukhov, engineer-polymath, inventor of breakthrough industrial designs (hyperboloid structure, thin-shell structure, tensile structure, gridshell), builder of Shukhov Towers and multiple other structures

== Aerospace engineers ==
- Rostislav Alexeyev, designer of high-speed Raketa hydrofoils and ekranoplans, including the Caspian Sea Monster
- Oleg Antonov, designer of the An-series aircraft, including A-40 winged tank and An-124 (the largest serial cargo aircraft, later modified to world's largest fixed-wing aircraft An-225)
- Georgy Babakin, designed the first soft lander spacecraft Luna 9
- Vladimir Barmin, designer of the first rocket launch complex (Baikonur Cosmodrome)
- Robert Bartini, developer of ekranoplans and VTOL amphibious aircraft, physicist, tutor to many other aerospace designers
- Alexander Bereznyak, designer of the first fighter rocket-powered aircraft, BI-1
- Georgy Beriev, designer of the Be-series amphibious aircraft
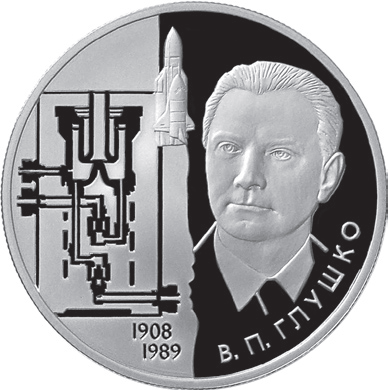
  Glushko
- Georgy Bothezat, inventor of quadcopter helicopter (The Flying Octopus)
- Vladimir Chelomey, designer of the first space station Salyut 1, creator of Proton rocket (the most used heavy lift launch system)
- Evgeniy Chertovsky, inventor of pressure suit
- Nicolas Florine, builder of the first successful tandem rotor helicopter
- Valentyn Glushko, inventor of hypergolic propellant and electrically powered spacecraft propulsion, designer of the world's most powerful liquid-fuel rocket engine RD-170
- Pyotr Grushin, inventor of anti-ballistic missile
- Mikhail Gurevich, designer of the MiG-series fighter aircraft, including world's most produced jet aircraft MiG-15 and most produced supersonic aircraft MiG-21
- Sergey Ilyushin, designed the Il-series fighter aircraft, including Il-2 bomber (the most produced military aircraft in history)
- Aleksei Isaev, designer of the first rocket-powered fighter aircraft, BI-1
- Mstislav Keldysh, co-developer of the first satellite (Sputnik) and Keldysh bomber
- Kerim Kerimov, the secret figure behind the Soviet space program
- Nikolay Kamov, designed the Ka-series coaxial rotor helicopters
  Kotelnikov
- Alexander Kemurdzhian, inventor of space rover (Lunokhod)
- Sergei Korolyov, the Father of the Soviet space program, inventor of the first intercontinental ballistic missile and the first space rocket (R-7 Semyorka), creator of the first satellite (Sputnik), supervisor of the first human spaceflight
- Gleb Kotelnikov, inventor of knapsack parachute and drogue parachute
- Semyon Lavochkin, designer of the La-series aircraft and the first operational surface-to-air missile S-25 Berkut
- Mikhail Lomonosov, polymath, inventor of coaxial rotor and the first helicopter
- Gleb Lozino-Lozinskiy, designer of the Buran space shuttle and Spiral project
- Arkhip Lyulka, designer of the Lyulka-series aircraft engines, including the first double jet turbofan
- Victor Makeev, developer of the first intercontinental SLBM
- Artem Mikoyan, designer of the MiG-series fighter aircraft, including world's most produced jet MiG-15 and most produced supersonic aircraft MiG-21
- Arseny Mironov, oldest scientist in flight dynamics and aircraft safety, Stalin Prize recipient (1948) for the new method of aerodynamic research, USSR State Prize recipient (1976) for the completion of flight testing of the Su-24 heavy fighter-bomber aircraft
- Mikhail Mil, designer of the Mi-series helicopters, including Mil Mi-8 (the world's most produced helicopter) and Mil Mi-12 (the world's largest helicopter)
- Alexander Mozhaysky, author of the first attempt to create heavier-than-air craft in Russia, designed the largest of 19th-century airplanes
- Alexander Nadiradze, designer of the first mobile ICBM RT-21 Temp 2S and the first reliable mobile ICBM RT-2PM Topol
- Nikolai Polikarpov, designer of the Po-series aircraft, including Po-2 Kukuruznik (world's most produced biplane)
- Alexander Procofieff de Seversky, inventor of ionocraft and gyroscopically stabilized bombsight
- Guy Severin, designed the first spacewalk supporting system
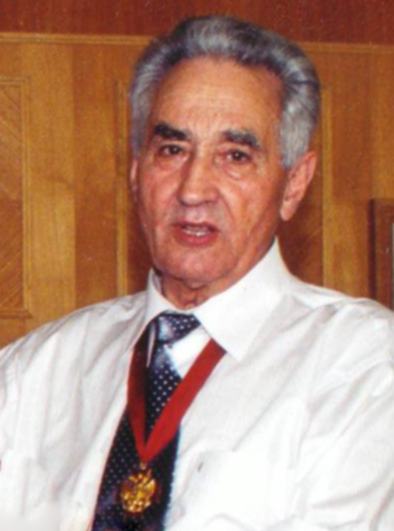
  Severin
- Igor Sikorsky, inventor of airliner and strategic bomber (Sikorsky Ilya Muromets), father of modern helicopter, founder of the Sikorsky Aircraft
- Boris Shavyrin, inventor of air-augmented rocket
- Pavel Sukhoi, designer of the Su-series fighter aircraft
- Vladimir Syromyatnikov, designer of the Androgynous Peripheral Attach System
- Max Taitz, scientist in aerodynamics, theory of jet engines and flight testing of aircraft, one of the founders of the Gromov Flight Research Institute, recipient of the Stalin Prize (1949 and 1953), Honoured Scientist of the RSFSR
- Mikhail Tikhonravov, designer of Sputniks, including the first artificial satellite Sputnik 1
- Konstantin Tsiolkovsky, principal pioneer of astronautics
- Alexei Tupolev, designer of the Tu-series aircraft, including the first supersonic transport Tu-144
- Andrey Tupolev, designer of the Tu-series aircraft, including the turboprop long-range airliner Tu-114 and turboprop strategic bomber Tu-95
- Vladimir Vakhmistrov, supervisor of Zveno project (the first bomber with parasite aircraft)
- Alexander Yakovlev, designer of the Yak-series aircraft, including the first regional jet Yak-40
- Friedrich Zander, designed the first liquid-fuel rocket in the Soviet Union, GIRD-X, pioneer of astronautics
- Nikolai Zhukovsky, founder of modern aero- and hydrodynamics, pioneer of aviation

== Naval engineers ==
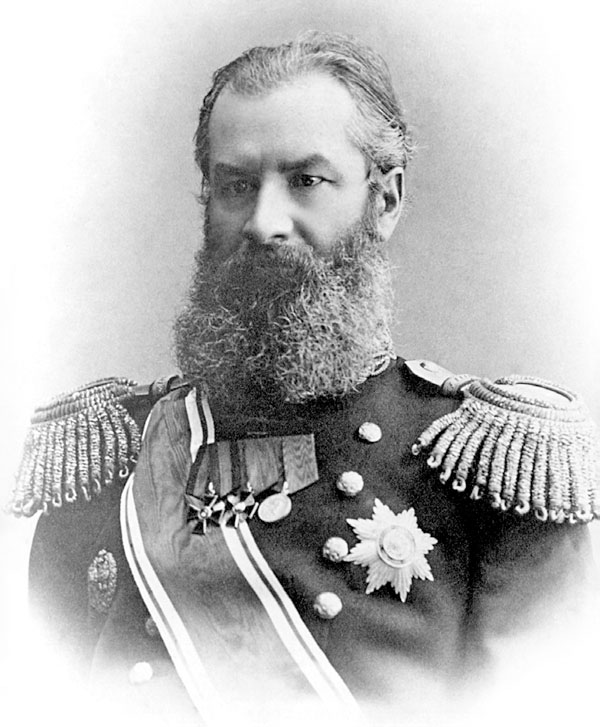
Krylov

- Rostislav Alexeyev, designer of high-speed Raketa hydrofoils and ekranoplans, including the Caspian Sea Monster
- Anatoly Alexandrov, inventor of degaussing, developer of naval nuclear reactors (including one for the first nuclear icebreaker)
- Mikhail Britnev, designer of the first metal-hull icebreaker Pilot
- Boris Jacobi, inventor of electric boat, developer of modern naval mining
- Konstantin Khrenov, inventor of underwater welding
- Alexey Krylov, general of the fleet, inventor of gyroscopic damping of ships, author of the insubmersibility theory

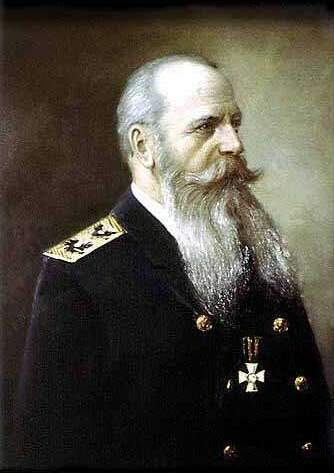
Makarov

- Fyodor Litke, explorer, inventor of recording tide measurer
- Stepan Makarov, admiral, war hero, oceanographer, inventor of torpedo boat tender, builder of the first polar icebreaker, author of the insubmersibility theory
- Victor Makeev, developer of the first intercontinental submarine-launched ballistic missile
- Ludvig Nobel, designer of the modern oil tanker
- Peter the Great, monarch and craftsman, inventor of yacht club and sounding line with separating plummet, founder of the Russian Navy
- Pavel Schilling, inventor of electric naval mine
- Igor Spassky, designer of the Sea Launch platform and over 200 nuclear submarines, including the world's largest submarines (Typhoon class)
- Vladimir Yourkevitch, designer of SS Normandie, developer of modern ship hull design

== Electrical engineers ==
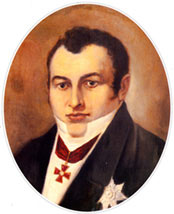
Schilling

- Zhores Alferov, physicist, inventor of heterotransistor, Nobel Prize winner
- Nikolay Benardos, inventor of carbon arc welding (the first practical arc welding method)
- Mikhail Dolivo-Dobrovolsky, inventor of three-phase electric power
- Boris Jacobi, inventor of electroplating, electrotyping, galvanoplastic sculpture and electric boat
- Konstantin Khrenov, inventor of underwater welding
- Dmitry Lachinov, inventor of electricity economizer, electrical insulation tester, pioneer of long-distance electricity transmission
- Alexander Lodygin, one of the inventors of incandescent light bulb, inventor of electric streetlight and tungsten filament
- Oleg Losev, inventor of light-emitting diode and crystadine
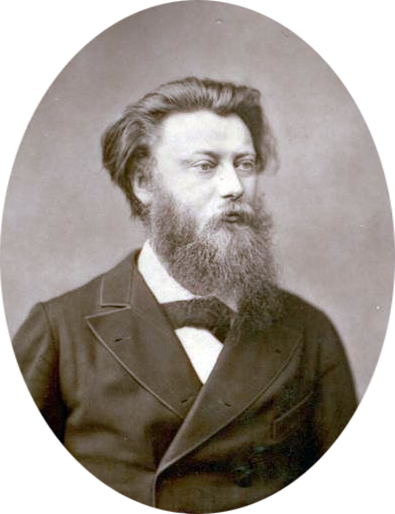
  Yablochkov
- Vasily Petrov, inventor of electric arc and arc welding
- Fyodor Pirotsky, inventor of railway electrification system and electric tram
- Alexander Poniatoff, inventor of videotape recorder
- Georg Wilhelm Richmann, inventor of electrometer, died from ball lightning during an experiment
- Pavel Schilling, inventor of shielded cable, electric mine and electromagnetic telegraph
- Nikolay Slavyanov, inventor of shielded metal arc welding
- Aleksandr Stoletov, physicist, inventor of photoelectric cell
- Pavel Yablochkov, inventor of Yablochkov candle (the first commercially viable electric lamp), AC transformer and headlamp

== Computer scientists ==
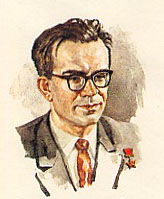
Glushkov

- Georgy Adelson-Velsky, inventor of AVL tree algorithm, developer of Kaissa (the first World Computer Chess Champion)
- Boris Babayan, developer of the Elbrus supercomputers
- Sergey Brin, inventor of the Google web search engine
- Nikolay Brusentsov, inventor of ternary computer (Setun)
- Mikhail Donskoy, a leading developer of Kaissa, the first computer chess champion
- Victor Glushkov, a founder of cybernetics, inventor of the first personal computer MIR
- Yevgeny Kaspersky, developer of Kaspersky anti-virus products
- Semen Korsakov, the first to use punched cards for information storage and search
- Evgeny Landis, inventor of AVL tree algorithm
- Sergey Lebedev, developer of the first Soviet and European electronic computers, MESM and BESM
- Leonid Levin, IT scientist, developed the Cook-Levin theorem
- Willgodt Theophil Odhner, inventor of the Odhner Arithmometer, the most popular mechanical calculator in the 20th century

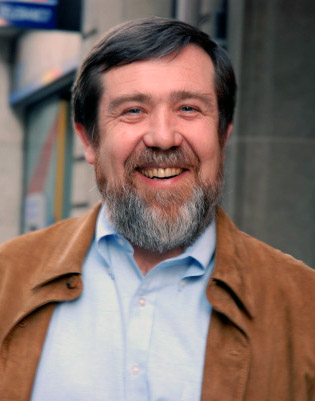
Pajitnov

- Alexey Pajitnov, inventor of Tetris
- Alexander Razborov, mathematician and computational theorist who won the Nevanlinna Prize in 1990 and the Gödel Prize for contributions to computer sciences
- Eugene Roshal, developer of the FAR file manager, RAR file format, WinRAR file archiver
- Valentin Turchin, inventor of Refal programming language, introduced metasystem transition and supercompilation

== See also ==
- Bibliography of science and technology in Russia and the Soviet Union
- List of scientists
- List of Russian inventors
- Science and technology in Russia
- Science and technology in the Soviet Union
- Timeline of Russian inventions
