= Index of physics articles (N) =

The index of physics articles is split into multiple pages due to its size.

To navigate by individual letter use the table of contents below.

== N ==
- N-Reactor
- N-body choreography
- N-body problem
- N-body simulation
- N-type semiconductor
- N-vector model
- N.V.V.J. Swamy
- N=2 superstring
- NA35 experiment
- NA48/1 experiment
- NA48/2 experiment
- NA48/3 experiment
- NA48 experiment
- NA49 experiment
- NA58 experiment
- NA60 experiment
- NA61
- NA61/SHINE
- NA62 experiment
- NACA airfoil
- NACA cowling
- NACA duct
- NAMD
- NASA/IPAC Extragalactic Database
- NASA Advanced Space Transportation Program
- NASA STI Program
- NDDO
- NESTOR Project
- NEVOD
- NIMs
- NINA (accelerator)
- NIST-F1
- NMSSM
- NNPDF
- NOON state
- NOνA
- NRX
- NS5-brane
- NUR Reactor
- N ray
- Nabor Carrillo Flores
- Nader Engheta
- Nahum Shahaf
- Nai-Chang Yeh
- Naked singularity
- Nambu mechanics
- Nambu–Goto action
- Nambu–Jona-Lasinio model
- Nandor Balazs
- Nano-PSI
- Nano-optics
- Nano-thermite
- Nano spray dryer
- Nanocellulose
- Nanochannel glass materials
- Nanocircuitry
- Nanoelectromechanical system
- Nanoelectronics
- Nanoengineering
- Nanofluidics
- Nanoindenter
- Nanoknife
- Nanolaser
- Nanolens
- Nanomagnet
- Nanoparticle
- Nanophotonics
- Nanoscopic scale
- Nanoshell
- Nanotechnology
- Nanotribology
- Narasimhaiengar Mukunda
- Naresh Dadhich (physicist)
- Naresh Dalal
- Narinder Singh Kapany
- Narrow-gap semiconductor
- Narrow bipolar pulse
- Natalia Dubrovinskaia
- Nathan Aviezer
- Nathan Isgur
- Nathan Rosen
- Nathan Seiberg
- National Atomic Testing Museum
- National Center for Earth-surface Dynamics
- National Centre for Physics
- National Compact Stellarator Experiment
- National High Magnetic Field Laboratory
- National Ignition Facility
- National Museum of Nuclear Science & History
- National Research Universal reactor
- National Spherical Torus Experiment
- National Synchrotron Light Source
- National Synchrotron Light Source II
- National Synchrotron Radiation Research Center
- Natterer compressor
- Natural Bridges National Monument Solar Power System
- Natural abundance
- Natural circulation
- Natural material
- Natural nuclear fission reactor
- Natural philosophy
- Natural remanent magnetisation
- Natural remanent magnetization
- Natural ventilation
- Nature
- Nature Communications
- Nature Materials
- Nature Nanotechnology
- Nature Photonics
- Nature Physics
- Navarro–Frenk–White profile
- Navier–Stokes equations
- Navier–Stokes existence and smoothness
- Navigation mesh
- Nazir Ahmed (physicist)
- Naïve physics
- Nd:GdVO4
- Nd:YAG laser
- Nd:YCOB
- Neal Francis Lane
- Neal H. Williams
- Near-extremal black hole
- Near-surface geophysics
- Near and far field
- Near edge X-ray absorption fine structure
- Nearly free electron model
- Negative differential conductivity
- Negative index material
- Negative index metamaterial
- Negative index metamaterials
- Negative index of refraction
- Negative luminescence
- Negative mass
- Negative phase-velocity
- Negative phase velocity
- Negative phase velocity medium
- Negative phase velocity mediums
- Negative phasevelocity
- Negative phase–velocity medium
- Negative phase–velocity mediums
- Negative probability
- Negative refraction
- Negative refractive index
- Negative refractive index material
- Negative refractive indices
- Negative resistance
- Negative temperature
- Negative thermal expansion
- Negativity (quantum mechanics)
- Negentropy
- Neil F. Johnson
- Neil Gershenfeld
- Neil J. Gunther
- Neil Turok
- Neil deGrasse Tyson
- Nekhoroshev estimates
- Nematicon
- Neo-Hookean solid
- Neodymium-doped yttrium lithium fluoride
- Neodymium-doped yttrium orthovanadate
- Neodymium magnet
- Neon-burning process
- Neon lighting
- Nernst effect
- Nernst–Planck equation
- Net force
- Net generation
- Net radiometer
- Network analysis (electrical circuits)
- Network automaton
- Network synthesis
- Network synthesis filters
- Neumann's law
- Neuronal noise
- Neutral beam injection
- Neutral buoyancy
- Neutral current
- Neutral density filter
- Neutral heavy lepton
- Neutral particle
- Neutral particle oscillation
- Neutralino
- Neutretto
- Neutrino
- Neutrino Array Radio Calibration
- Neutrino Ettore Majorana Observatory
- Neutrino Factory
- Neutrino astronomy
- Neutrino decoupling
- Neutrino detector
- Neutrino mixing matrix
- Neutrino oscillation
- Neutrino telescope
- Neutrino theory of light
- Neutrium
- Neutron
- Neutron-induced swelling
- Neutron Science Laboratory
- Neutron Time Of Flight
- Neutron absorption
- Neutron activation
- Neutron activation analysis
- Neutron backscattering
- Neutron bomb
- Neutron capture
- Neutron capture nucleosynthesis
- Neutron cross section
- Neutron detection
- Neutron diffraction
- Neutron economy
- Neutron emission
- Neutron flux
- Neutron generator
- Neutron interferometer
- Neutron magnetic moment
- Neutron moderator
- Neutron monitor
- Neutron number
- Neutron poison
- Neutron probe
- Neutron radiation
- Neutron reflectometry
- Neutron reflector
- Neutron research facility
- Neutron scattering
- Neutron source
- Neutron spin echo
- Neutron star
- Neutron supermirror
- Neutron temperature
- Neutron time-of-flight scattering
- Neutron transport
- Neutronium
- Nevill Francis Mott
- Neville Robinson
- Nevis Laboratories
- New Journal of Physics
- Newman–Penrose formalism
- Newton's cannonball
- Newton's cradle
- Newton's law of universal gravitation
- Newton's laws of motion
- Newton's notation
- Newton's rings
- Newton's theorem of revolving orbits
- Newton second
- Newton (unit)
- Newton disc
- Newton metre
- Newtonian fluid
- Newtonian gauge
- Newtonian limit
- Newtonian motivations for general relativity
- Newton–Cartan theory
- Newton–Euler equations
- Newton–Wigner localization
- Next Generation Nuclear Plant
- Ni Weidou
- Niccolò Zucchi
- Nicholas B. Suntzeff
- Nicholas Callan
- Nicholas Christofilos
- Nicholas J. Phillips
- Nicholas Kemmer
- Nicholas Kurti
- Nicholas Metropolis
- Nick Herbert (physicist)
- Nick Holonyak
- Nick Newman (naval architect)
- Nicol prism
- Nicola Cabibbo
- Nicola Scafetta
- Nicolaas Bloembergen
- Nicolaas Hartsoeker
- Nicolae Filip
- Nicolae Vasilescu-Karpen
- Nicolas-Philippe Ledru
- Nicolas Clément
- Nicolas Fuss
- Nicolas Léonard Sadi Carnot
- Nicolas Rashevsky
- Nicolaus Copernicus
- Nicolás Cabrera
- Niels Bohr
- Niels Bohr Institute
- Niels Bohr Institute for Astronomy, Geophysics and Physics
- Niels Bohr Institute for Astronomy, Physics and Geophysics
- Nielsen–Olesen vortex
- Nielsen–Olsen string
- Nigel G. Stocks
- Nigel Lockyer
- Night Thoughts of a Classical Physicist
- Nihat Berker
- Nike laser
- Nikita Nekrasov
- Nikola Tesla
- Nikola Tesla Museum
- Nikolai Borisovich Delone
- Nikolai Kasterin
- Nikolai Pilchikov
- Nikolai Pylchykov
- Nikolai Shakura
- Nikolas Tombazis
- Nikolay Basov
- Nikolay Bogolyubov
- Nikolay Dollezhal
- Nikolay Kudryavtsev
- Nikolay Neprimerov
- Nikolay Rukavishnikov
- Nikolay Semyonov
- Nikolay Sergeyevich Krylov
- Nikolay Umov
- Nikolay Yegorovich Zhukovsky
- Nima Arkani-Hamed
- Nimrod (synchrotron)
- Nimrud lens
- Nina Byers
- Ning Li (physicist)
- Nishina Memorial Prize
- Nitrogen-vacancy center
- Nitrogen laser
- No-broadcast theorem
- No-cloning theorem
- No-communication theorem
- No-go theorem
- No-hair theorem
- No-slip condition
- No-teleportation theorem
- Noah Ernest Dorsey
- Nobel Prize in Physics
- Node (physics)
- Noemie Benczer Koller
- Noether's second theorem
- Noether's theorem
- Noether identities
- Noise
- Noise-equivalent flux density
- Noise-equivalent power
- Noise-equivalent target
- Noise (audio)
- Noise (electronic)
- Noise (electronics)
- Noise (radio)
- Noise (telecommunications)
- Noise (video)
- Noise barrier
- Noise figure
- Noise floor
- Noise map
- Noise measurement
- Noise power
- Noise print
- Noise reduction coefficient
- Noise temperature
- Noise weighting
- Noisy black
- Noisy white
- Nomarski prism
- Non-Gaussianity
- Non-Newtonian fluid
- Non-abelian gauge transformation
- Non-achromatic objective
- Non-autonomous mechanics
- Non-contact force
- Non-critical string
- Non-critical string theory
- Non-critical string theory: Lorentz invariance
- Non-dimensionalization and scaling of the Navier–Stokes equations
- Non-equilibrium statistical mechanics
- Non-equilibrium thermodynamics
- Non-exact solutions in general relativity
- Non-inclined orbit
- Non-inertial frame
- Non-inertial reference frame
- Non-linear sigma model
- Non-orientable wormhole
- Non-perturbative
- Non-standard cosmology
- Non-topological soliton
- Non-uniform circular motion
- Non-zero dispersion-shifted fiber
- Nonbaryonic dark matter
- Nonclassical light
- Noncommutative quantum field theory
- Nondimensionalization
- Nonequilibrium Gas and Plasma Dynamics Laboratory
- Nonequilibrium partition identity
- Nonextensive entropy
- Nonholonomic system
- Nonimaging optics
- Nonlinear acoustics
- Nonlinear control
- Nonlinear metamaterials
- Nonlinear optics
- Nonlinear partial differential equation
- Nonlinear photonic crystal
- Nonlinear resonance
- Nonlinear Schrödinger equation
- Nonlinear system
- Nonlinear X-wave
- Nonlinearity (journal)
- Nonlocal Lagrangian
- Nonoblique correction
- Nonrectifying junction
- Nonsingular black hole models
- Nonsymmetric gravitational theory
- Nonthermal plasma
- Noor Muhammad Butt
- Nordström's theory of gravitation
- Nordtvedt effect
- Normal force
- Normal mode
- Normal moveout
- Normal order
- Normal shock tables
- Normal strain
- Normalizable wave function
- Norman Christ
- Norman Feather
- Norman Foster Ramsey, Jr.
- Norman Haskell
- Norman Holter
- Norman Kember
- Norman Packard
- Norman Robert Campbell
- Noro–Frenkel law of corresponding states
- Norris Bradbury
- Northstar Electronics
- Norton's theorem
- Nose cone design
- Nova
- Nova (laser)
- November Revolution (physics)
- Novette laser
- Novikov–Veselov equation
- Nozzle
- Nth Country Experiment
- NuMI
- Nucifer experiment
- Nuclear Instrumentation Module
- Nuclear Instruments
- Nuclear Instruments and Methods
- Nuclear Instruments and Methods in Physics Research
- Nuclear Instruments and Methods in Physics Research A
- Nuclear Instruments and Methods in Physics Research B
- Nuclear Overhauser effect
- Nuclear Physics (disambiguation)
- Nuclear Physics (journal)
- Nuclear Physics A
- Nuclear Physics B
- Nuclear Physics B: Proceedings Supplements
- Nuclear Power Demonstration
- Nuclear Safety Research Reactor
- Nuclear Science Abstracts
- Nuclear aircraft
- Nuclear astrophysics
- Nuclear attribution
- Nuclear binding energy
- Nuclear chain reaction
- Nuclear cross section
- Nuclear data
- Nuclear density
- Nuclear detection
- Nuclear drip line
- Nuclear explosion
- Nuclear explosive
- Nuclear fission
- Nuclear fission product
- Nuclear force
- Nuclear fuel
- Nuclear fuel cycle information system
- Nuclear fusion
- Nuclear isomer
- Nuclear magnetic moment
- Nuclear magnetic resonance
- Nuclear magnetic resonance crystallography
- Nuclear magnetic resonance in porous media
- Nuclear magnetic resonance quantum computer
- Nuclear magnetic resonance spectroscopy
- Nuclear magnetic resonance spectroscopy of nucleic acids
- Nuclear magnetic resonance spectroscopy of proteins
- Nuclear magneton
- Nuclear material
- Nuclear matter
- Nuclear microscopy
- Nuclear physics
- Nuclear power
- Nuclear pumped laser
- Nuclear quadrupole resonance
- Nuclear reaction
- Nuclear reactor
- Nuclear reactor safety systems
- Nuclear resonance fluorescence
- Nuclear resonance vibrational spectroscopy
- Nuclear safety
- Nuclear shell model
- Nuclear size
- Nuclear structure
- Nuclear timescale
- Nuclear transmutation
- Nuclear waste management
- Nuclear weapon design
- Nuclearelectrica
- Nucleate boiling
- Nucleocosmogenesis
- Nucleogenesis
- Nucleon
- Nucleon pair breaking in fission
- Nucleon spin structure
- Nucleosynthesis
- Nuclide
- Nuclotron
- Nuker Team
- Null corrector
- Null dust solution
- Null surface
- Nuller
- Nulling interferometry
- Number density
- Numerical model of the Solar System
- Numerical relativity
- Numerical sign problem
- Numerical weather prediction
- Nuovo Cim.
- Nuovo Cimento
- Nuovo Cimento A
- Nuovo Cimento B
- Nuovo Cimento C
- Nuovo Cimento D
- Nuovo Cimento Rivista
- Nusselt number
- Nutation
- Nuts and bolts (general relativity)
- Néel relaxation theory
- Néel temperature
