= Time scale =

Time scale may refer to:

- Time standard, a specification of either the rate at which time passes, points in time, or both
- A duration or quantity of time:
  - Orders of magnitude (time) as a power of 10 in seconds;
  - A specific unit of time
- Geological time scale, a scale that divides up the history of Earth into scientifically meaningful periods

In astronomy and physics:

- Dynamical time scale (stellar physics), the time in which changes in one part of a body can be communicated to the rest of that body
- Dynamical time scale, in celestial mechanics, a realization of a time-like argument based on a dynamical theory
- Nuclear timescale, an estimate of the lifetime of a star based solely on its rate of fuel consumption
- Thermal time scale, an estimate of the lifetime of a star once the fuel reserves at its center are used up

In cosmology and particle physics:

- Planck time, the time scale beneath which quantum effects are comparable in significance to gravitational effects

In mathematics:

- Time-scale calculus, the unification of the theory of difference equations with differential equations

In music:

- Rhythm, a temporal pattern of events
- Time scale (music), which divides music into sections of time

In project management:

- Man-hour, the time scale used in project management to account for human labor planned or utilized
