= Nuts and Bolts =

Nuts and Bolts may refer to:

- Nuts and bolts, hardware fasteners
- Nuts and Bolts (TV series), a British television series
- Nuts & Bolts (film), a short film
- Banjo-Kazooie: Nuts & Bolts, a video game
- Nuts and bolts (general relativity), fixed point sets of the symmetry group in general relativity
- Nuts + Bolts, an American television series
