= Nuclear physics (disambiguation) =

Nuclear physics may refer to:

- Nuclear physics
  - High energy nuclear physics
- Nuclear Physics (journal)
- Nuclear Physics News
- Office of Nuclear Physics, United States Department of Energy
- In biophysics, it may refer to the physical processes that take place in a cell's nucleus

== See also ==
- Institute of Nuclear Physics (disambiguation)
