= Shelly Lesher =

Nuclear physicist

Shelly Lesher is a Professor and Chair of Physics at the North Carolina A&T State University and a Guest Professor at the University of Notre Dame. In 2021 Lesher was appointed the Director of the University of Wisconsin, La Crosse's McNair Scholars Program. Lesher has authored over 55 scientific publications in journals such as Physical Review C, Physical Review Letters, and Nuclear Physics A. Her scientific research is funded by the National Science Foundation. Serving as the Director of the Division of Nuclear Physics Conference Experience for Undergraduate (CEU) program, Lesher has also served as the chair of the American Physical Society's Committee on International Freedom of Scientists. She works on educating non-science majors in nuclear issues which includes developing and hosting a podcast called My Nuclear Life available to the public. She received her Ph.D. from the University of Kentucky and has held postdoctoral fellowships at the Katholieke Universiteit Leuven in Belgium and Lawrence Livermore National Laboratory. Lesher was named a Yale Presidential Visiting Scholar for the 2019–2020 academic year and in 2020 a Fellow of the American Physical Society.
