= Van der Woude =

Van der Woude is a Dutch toponymic surname meaning "from the forest". The dative form of the particle indicates that the first people carrying the name came from a place called Het Woud of De Woud(e) ("the forest"). Less common variants are Van der Wouden and Van der Woud. People with this name include:

- Adriaan van der Woude (1930–2017), Dutch physicist
- Elizabeth van der Woude (1657–1694), Dutch traveller and writer
- Hatte van der Woude (born 1969), Dutch politician
- John Vander Woude, American politician
- Marc van der Woude (born 1960), Dutch jurist
- Willem van der Woude (1876–1974), Dutch mathematician

== See also ==
- Van der Woude syndrome, congenital disorder first described in 1954 by American physician Anne Van der Woude (?–?)
- 5916 van der Woude, main-belt asteroid, named after Jet Propulsion Laboratory Image Coordinator Jurrie van der Woude (1935–2015)
