= Thermal time =

Thermal time may refer to:

- Thermal time scale, an astrophysical measure
- Thermal time hypothesis, the idea in physics that time is emergent
- Thermal death time
