= List of network theory topics =

Network theory is an area of applied mathematics.

This page is a list of network theory topics.

== Network theorems ==
- Max flow min cut theorem
- Menger's theorem
- Metcalfe's law

== Network properties ==
- Centrality
- Betweenness centrality
- Closeness

== Network theory applications ==
- Bose-Einstein condensation: a network theory approach

== Networks with certain properties ==
- Complex network
- Scale-free network
- Small-world network
- Small world phenomenon

== Other terms ==
- Bottleneck (network)
- Blockmodeling
- Network automaton
- Network effect
- Network flow
- Pathfinder network
- Scalability
- Sorting network
- Space syntax
- Spanning Tree Protocol
- Strategyproof
- Structural cohesion
- Vickrey–Clarke–Groves
- Tree and hypertree networks

== Examples of networks ==
- Bayesian network
- Bridges of Königsberg
- Computer network
- Ecological network
- Electrical network
- Gene regulatory network
- Global shipping network
- Neural network
- Project network
- Petri net
- Semantic network
- Social network
- Spin network
- Telecommunications network
- Value network
- Workflow
- Metabolic network
- Metabolic network modelling
