= Nano-PSI =

Plasma device in Eindhoven, The Netherlands

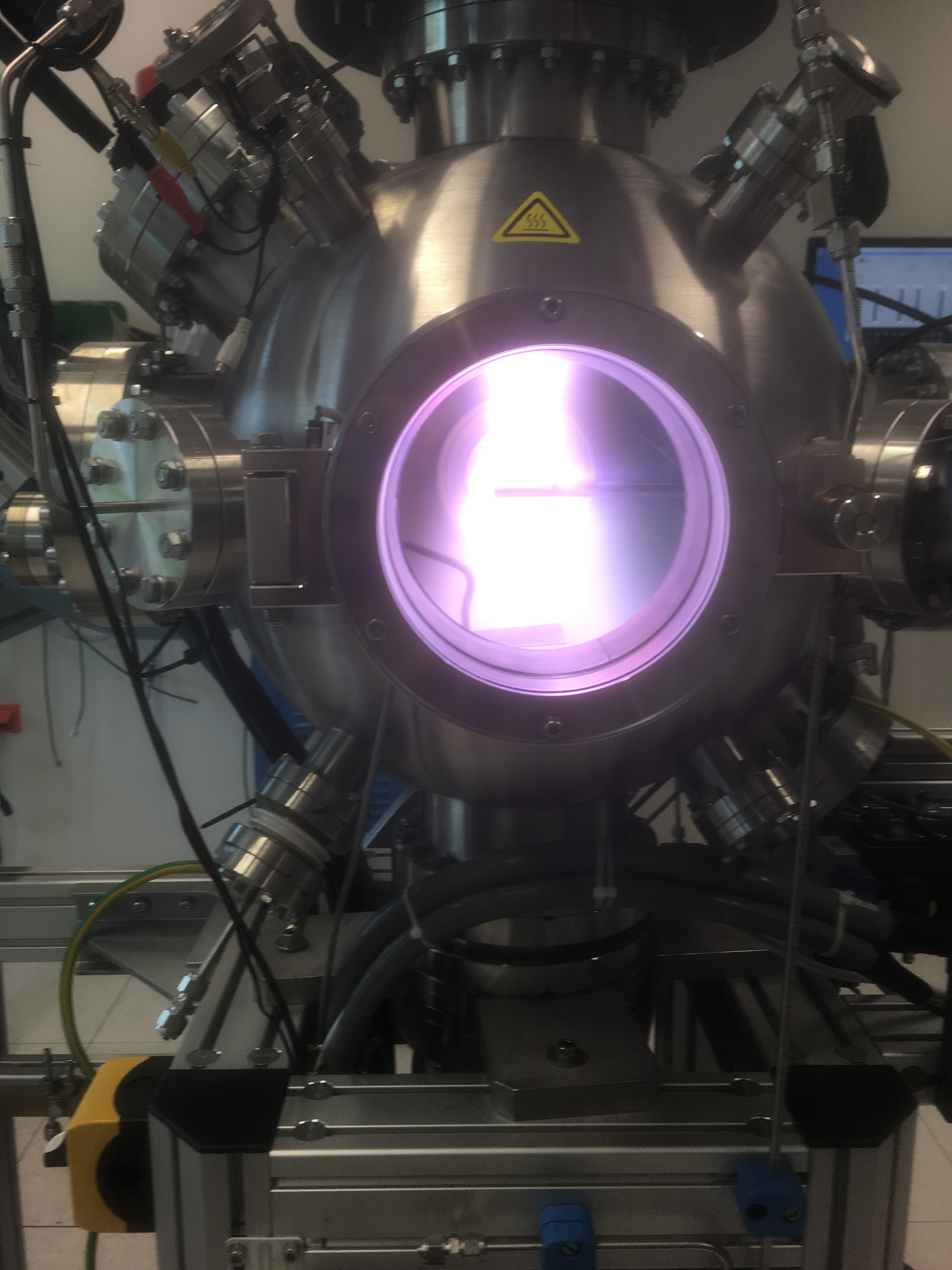
Argon plasma in the nano-PSI vessel

Iron sample is about to be exposed to argon plasma

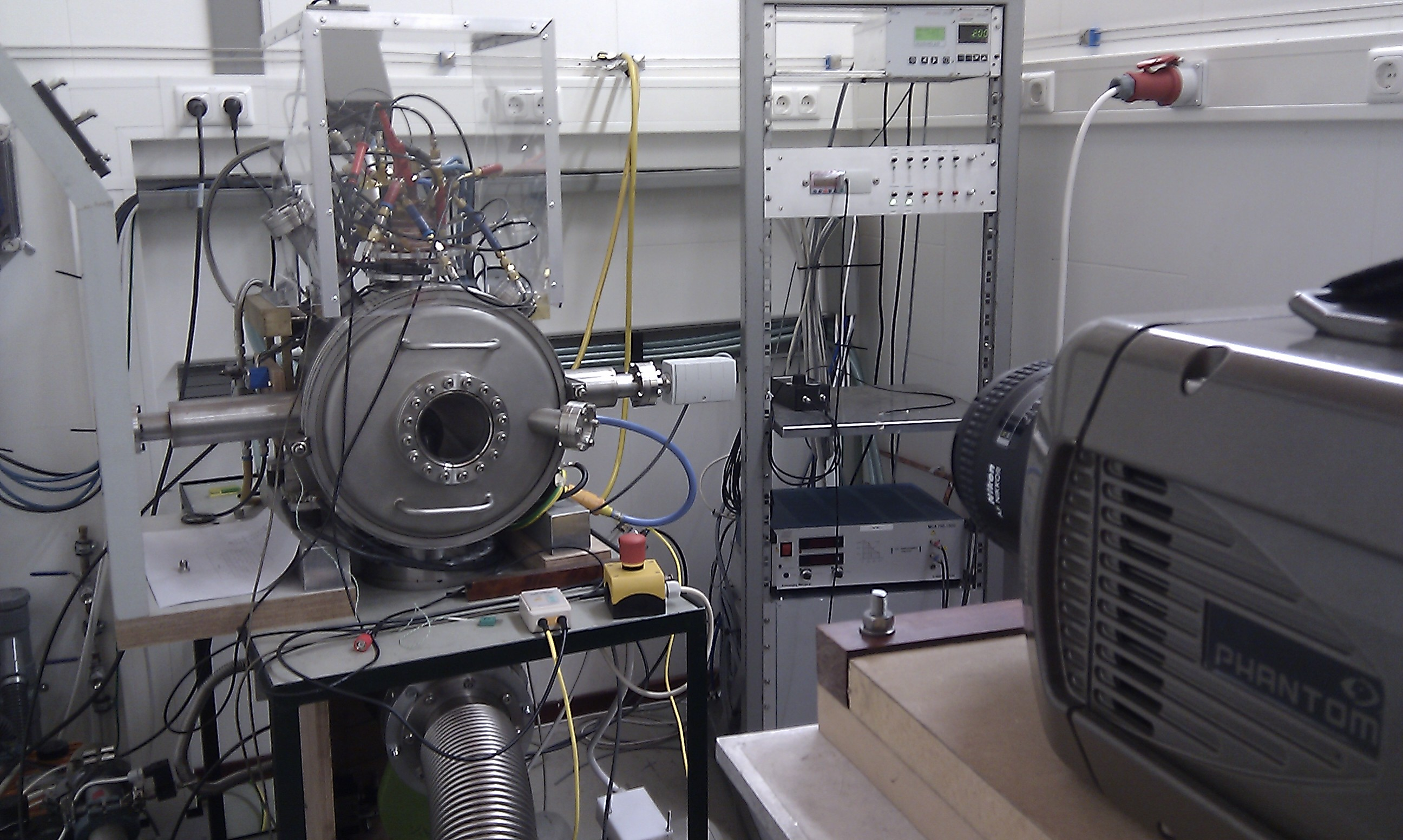
Picture of high-speed camera possibilities of nano-PSI

Nano-PSI is a plasma device at the Differ – Dutch Institute For Fundamental Energy Research ("DIFFER".) research institute in Eindhoven. It is used for experimental research at the junction of plasma physics and materials science. 'PSI' stands for Plasma Surface Interactions, while 'nano' has been chosen to stress the mission of the device to synthesize various nanostructures. Nano-PSI is the belongs to the family of plasma generators at DIFFER, that also hosts the Magnum-PSI and UPP-PSI linear devices.

The plasma is created by a Cascaded Arc Plasma Source, which exhausts into the spherical vacuum vessel. Gases such as Helium, Hydrogen, Nitrogen, Argon, Xenon can be used to create plasma. Samples are mounted in direct view of the plasma. The plasma species interact with the atoms of the sample, leading to surface modifications. In general this process is called plasma processing.

A Langmuir probe can be used to determine the plasma parameters, such as density and temperature. The substrate holder can be electrically biased to attract desired quantities of ions or electrons. Besides, it is possible to use a heated target holder or a cooled targetholder to mount the sample to a given temperature during operation. Large transient heat fluxes can be created when the plasma source is coupled to a capacitor bank.

Nano-PSI has been decommissioned in 2024, its successor LiMeS-Wetting is located in the same institute and is used for wetting studies of Tin on Tungsten.

== See also ==
- Chemical vapor deposition
- Pulsed laser deposition
- LiMeS-Wetting
- Gas discharge plasmas and their applications.
- Semiconductor manufacturing; Plasma-enhanced chemical vapor deposition
- National Spherical Torus Experiment in nuclear fusion
