= Dmytro Pylchykov =

Ukrainian pan-slavist, civic and cultural activist and teacher

- Дмитро Пильчиков
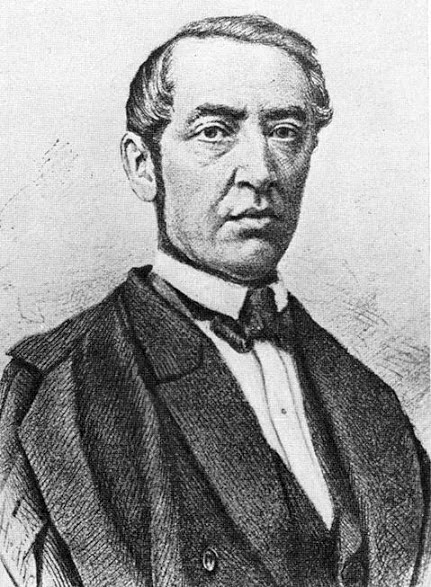
- Born: October 26, 1821; Kherson Governorate, Russian Empire
- Died: October 5, 1893 (aged 71); Kharkiv, Russian Empire
- Occupations: civic and cultural activist, teacher

Dmytro Pavlovych Pylchykov (Ukrainian: Дмитро Павлович Пильчиков; Russian: Дмитрий Павлович Пильчиков; 7 November [O.S. 26 October] 1821 – 17 October [O.S. 5 October] 1893) was a Ukrainian pan-slavist, civic and cultural activist, teacher, and a member of the Ukrainian National Revival society known as the Brotherhood of Saints Cyril and Methodius.

== Life ==
In 1863, Dmytro Pylchykov graduated from the historical-philological faculty of the Kyiv University. After that he worked as assistant librarian in the same University in Kyiv. In 1846–1864 years he taught at the Poltava Cadet Corps. 1846 he joined the so-called Brotherhood of Saints Cyril and Methodius.

In 1860-1870s took part in the National democratic movement, he was a member and active advocate Ukrainophilia in the Governorate of Poltava. In the 1870s maintained contacts with the Galician public and cultural figures, and with Mykhailo Drahomanov.

In 1873 while in Lviv, Pylchykov gave money to Elisabeth Miloradovic (aunt of Pavlo Skoropadsky) on creation of the literary society of Taras Shevchenko (later known as Shevchenko Scientific Society).

He died on October 5 (October 17, New Style), 1893 in Kharkiv.

Dmytro Pylchykov was father of prominent Ukrainian physicist, inventor, and geologist Mykola Pylchykov.
