= Thermal time scale =

Stellar astronomy - time scale

In astrophysics, the thermal time scale or Kelvin–Helmholtz time scale is the approximate time it takes for a star to radiate away its total kinetic energy content at its current luminosity rate. Along with the nuclear and free-fall (aka dynamical) time scales, it is used to estimate the length of time a particular star will remain in a certain phase of its life and its lifespan if hypothetical conditions are met. In reality, the lifespan of a star is greater than what is estimated by the thermal time scale because as one fuel becomes scarce, another will generally take its place – hydrogen burning gives way to helium burning, which is replaced by carbon burning.

== Stellar astrophysics ==
The size of a star as well as its energy output generally determine a star's thermal lifetime because the measurement is independent of the type of fuel normally found at its center. Indeed, the thermal time scale assumes that there is no fuel at all inside the star and simply predicts the length of time it would take for the resulting change in outputted energy to reach the surface of the star and become visually apparent to an outside observer.

$$\tau_\text{th} = \frac{\mbox{total kinetic energy}}{\mbox{rate of energy loss}} \approx \cfrac{GM^2}{2RL}$$

where G is the gravitational constant, M is the mass of the star, R is the radius of the star, and L is the star's luminosity. As an example, the Sun's thermal time scale is approximately 15.7 million years.
