= Adriaan van der Woude =

Dutch physicist (1930–2017)

Adriaan van der Woude (3 June 1930 in Westerbroek – 20 August 2017) was a Dutch nuclear physicist, known as a leading expert on giant resonances.

== Education and career ==
He matriculated in 1948 at the University of Groningen, where he graduated in 1954 with s M.Sc. equivalent and in 1960 with a Ph.D. His doctoral dissertation Construction and operation of betatron and cloud chamber was supervised by Hendrik "Henk" Brinkmann (1909–1994). Van der Woude worked from 1960 to 1963 in Brinkmann's group at the University of Groningen's Physics Laboratory. From 1963 to 1965 he was on a leave of absence from the University of Groningen and did research at Oak Ridge National Laboratory on nuclear and atomic physics. He was employed from 1965 to August 1967 at the University of Groningen, from 1967 to 1972 as a staff member at Oak Ridge National Laboratory, and from 1972 as a senior scientist at the University of Groningen's newly established Kernfysisch Versneller Instituut (KVI Groningen); this nuclear physics accelerator institute has had since 1996 a superconducting cyclotron called AGOR (Accelerateur Groningen-ORsay) developed after a French-Dutch partnership, with cyclotron construction approved in December 1985, between KVI Groningen and the Institut de physique nucléaire d'Orsay (IPNOrsay]. The AGOR cyclotron facility is useful for "radio-biology research and radiation hardness testing of electronics and materials."

Adriaan was appointed professor at the University of Groningen in 1980 and was associate director of KVI for several years. In that period, he played a key role in defining the KVI's future plans. He facilitated the collaboration with IPN-Orsay to build the superconducting AGOR-cyclotron, which has been operational since 1996. During the construction period, he led the project, together with Sydney Galès, and spent a sabbatical year in Orsay for that purpose.

Van der Woude became a member of the Nuclear Physics European Collaboration Committee (NuPECC). In 1990 he became the chair of the editorial board of NuPECC's Nuclear Physics News and the chair of the Groningen Royal Physical Society.

In 1979 he was elected a Fellow of the American Physical Society. Later he was appointed an Officer of the Order of Orange-Nassau.

On the occasion of his retirement in 1995 the international “Giant Resonances” Conference was held in Groningen in his honor.

== Selected publications ==
- Speth, J., ed. (October 1991). "Chapter II: The Electric Giant Resonances by A. van der Woude". Electric and Magnetic Giant Resonances in Nuclei. International Review of Nuclear Physics – volume 7. pp. 100–233. ISBN 9789810237981.
- Van Der Woude, Adriaan (1996). "Accomplishments, Problems and Challenges in Giant Resonance Research". APS Division of Nuclear Physics Meeting Abstracts. Bibcode:1996APS..DNP..AB01V.
- Harakeh, Mohsin N.; van der Woude, A. (July 2001). Giant Resonances: Fundamental High-Frequency Modes of Nuclear Excitation. Oxford Studies in Nuclear Physics. Oxford University Press. ISBN 978-0-19-851733-7.
