= Integrated Nuclear Fuel Cycle Information System =

International Atomic Energy Agency information database

Integrated Nuclear Fuel Cycle Information System (iNFCIS) is a set of databases related to the nuclear fuel cycle maintained by the International Atomic Energy Agency (IAEA). The main objective of iNFCIS is to provide information on all aspects of nuclear fuel cycle to various researchers, analysts, energy planners, academicians, students and the general public. Presently iNFCIS includes several modules. iNFCIS requires free registration for on-line access.

== Background ==
Nuclear fuel cycle consists of a number of steps which are critical in supporting a nuclear power programme. This included fuel supply-related activities in the front end and used or spent fuel-related activities in the back end. Reliable and accurate statistical data on worldwide nuclear fuel cycle activities is desired by the nuclear community for national policy making, international co-operation and studies pertaining to sustainable global energy futures. The IAEA provides up-to-date fuel cycle information to Member States, organizations and stakeholders, so as to understand, plan and develop nuclear fuel cycle programmes and activities. iNFCIS, a web-based system comprising several nuclear fuel cycle-related databases, is one source of such information.

== Data sources ==
IAEA over years has accumulated a large volume of data on nuclear fuel cycle activities through its regular technical meetings and publications, wherein contributions from Member States and leading international experts has been assimilated. IAEA had initiated electronic preservation of this data more than 20 years back, and since the last 10 years it has been made freely available through the public Internet. The data is regularly updated through direct inputs from the Member States, by consultants engaged by the IAEA or from open sources. All data is reviewed by consultants continuously to maintain high quality.

== Modules ==
iNFCIS presently includes the follow databases and a simulation tool:

- NFCIS – The Nuclear fuel cycle information system provides details regarding civilian nuclear fuel cycle facilities around the world. It contains information on operational and non-operational, planned, and cancelled facilities. All stages of nuclear fuel cycle activities are included, starting from uranium ore production to spent fuel storage facilities. NFCIS data has been used for analyses and studies related to nuclear fuel cycle.

- UDEPO – The World distribution of uranium deposits database is an on-line database of uranium deposits around the world. It includes classification of deposits, technical information about the deposits, detailed geological information about regions, districts and deposits. UDEPO is widely cited as an authentic source of information on uranium resources.
- ThDEPO – The World Thorium Deposits and Resources database is an on-line database of thorium deposits.
- PIEDB – The Post irradiation examination facilities database is a catalogue of hot laboratories maintained by the IAEA. It includes details of the main characteristics of hot cells and their PIE capabilities.
- MADB – The Minor actinide property database is a bibliographic database of physico-chemical properties of selected minor actinide compounds and alloys. The materials properties are selected based on their importance in the advanced nuclear fuel cycle options.
- NFCSS – The Nuclear fuel cycle simulation system is a scenario-based tool to estimate material flow in the nuclear fuel cycle. NFCSS is developed based on a model designed to estimate long-term nuclear fuel cycle requirements and actinide arisings.

== Publications ==
The following are the print publications based on iNFCIS:

- Nuclear Fuel Cycle Information System:A Directory of Nuclear Fuel Cycle Facilities 2009 Edition
- The Nuclear Fuel Cycle Information System, 1996 Edition
- The Nuclear Fuel Cycle Information System
- World Distribution of Uranium Deposits (UDEPO), with Uranium Deposit Classification

== See also ==
- Nuclear reprocessing
- Nuclear fission product
- Activation product
- Reprocessed uranium
- Plutonium
- MOX fuel
- Uranium mining
- Enriched uranium
- Post Irradiation Examination
- Spent nuclear fuel
- Spent nuclear fuel shipping cask
- Nuclear Fuel Cycle Information System
