= Free fall =

Motion of a body subject only to gravity

In classical mechanics, free fall is any motion of a body where gravity is the only force acting upon it. A freely falling object may not necessarily be falling down in the vertical direction. If the common definition of the word "fall" is used, an object moving upwards is not considered to be falling, but using scientific definitions, if it is subject to only the force of gravity, it is said to be in free fall. The Moon is thus in free fall around the Earth, though its orbital speed keeps it in very far orbit from the Earth's surface.

In a roughly uniform gravitational field, gravity acts on each part of a body approximately equally. When there are no other forces, such as the normal force exerted between a body (e.g., an astronaut in orbit) and its surrounding objects, it will result in the sensation of weightlessness, a condition that also occurs when the gravitational field is weak (such as when the body is far away from any source of gravity).

The term "free fall" is often used more loosely than in the strict sense defined above. Thus, falling through an atmosphere without a deployed parachute, or lifting device, is also often referred to as free fall. The aerodynamic drag forces in such situations prevent them from producing full weightlessness, and thus a skydiver's "free fall" after reaching terminal velocity produces the sensation of the body's weight being supported on a cushion of air.

In the context of general relativity, where gravitation is reduced to a space-time curvature, a body in free fall has no force acting on it.

== History ==
In the Western world prior to the 16th century, it was generally assumed that the speed of a falling body would be proportional to its weight—that is, a 10 kg object was expected to fall ten times faster than an otherwise identical 1 kg object through the same medium. The ancient Greek philosopher Aristotle (384–322 BC) discussed falling objects in Physics (Book VII), one of the oldest books on mechanics (see Aristotelian physics). Although, in the 6th century, John Philoponus challenged this argument and said that, by observation, two balls of very different weights will fall at nearly the same speed.

In 12th-century Iraq, Abu'l-Barakāt al-Baghdādī gave an explanation for the gravitational acceleration of falling bodies. According to Shlomo Pines, al-Baghdādī's theory of motion was "the oldest negation of Aristotle's fundamental dynamic law [namely, that a constant force produces a uniform motion], [and is thus an] anticipation in a vague fashion of the fundamental law of classical mechanics [namely, that a force applied continuously produces acceleration]."

=== Domingo de Soto ===
In 1551 Domingo de Soto became the first to state that a body in free fall accelerates uniformly and that this acceleration is caused by the mass of the Earth This key concept of physics was essential for the later studies of gravity by Galileo and Newton. Galileo credited De Soto as his inspiration and source of his studies, but Isaac Newton, despite having read Galileo Galilei, never mentioned him. In the 20th century, Pierre Duhem credited him with important achievements in dynamics and viewed his work as a forerunner of modern mechanics.

=== Galileo Galilei ===
According to a tale that may be apocryphal, in 1589–1592 Galileo dropped two objects of unequal mass from the Leaning Tower of Pisa. Given the speed at which such a fall would occur, it is doubtful that Galileo could have extracted much information from this experiment. Most of his observations of falling bodies were really of bodies rolling down ramps. This slowed things down enough to the point where he was able to measure the time intervals with water clocks and his own pulse (stopwatches having not yet been invented). He repeated this "a full hundred times" until he had achieved "an accuracy such that the deviation between two observations never exceeded one-tenth of a pulse beat." In 1589–1592, Galileo wrote De Motu Antiquiora, an unpublished manuscript on the motion of falling bodies.

== Examples ==
Examples of objects in free fall include:

- A spacecraft (in space) with propulsion off (e.g., in a continuous orbit, or on a suborbital trajectory (ballistics) going up for some minutes, and then down).
- An object dropped at the top of a drop tube.
- An object thrown upward or a person jumping off the ground at low speed (i.e., as long as air resistance is negligible in comparison to weight).

Technically, an object is in free fall even when moving upwards or instantaneously at rest at the top of its motion. If gravity is the only influence acting, then the acceleration is always downward and has the same magnitude for all bodies, commonly denoted $g$.

Since all objects fall at the same rate in the absence of other forces, objects and people will experience weightlessness in these situations.

Examples of objects not in free-fall:

- Flying in an aircraft: there is also an additional force of lift.
- Standing on the ground: the gravitational force is counteracted by the normal force from the ground.
- Descending to the Earth using a parachute, which balances the force of gravity with an aerodynamic drag force (and with some parachutes, an additional lift force).

The example of a falling skydiver who has not yet deployed a parachute is not considered free fall from a physics perspective, since they experience a drag force that equals their weight once they have achieved terminal velocity (see below).

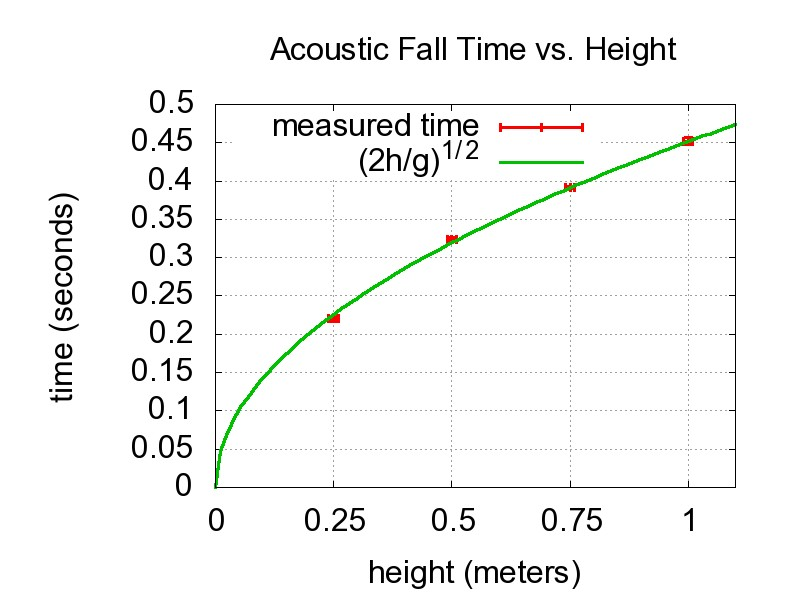
Measured fall time of a small steel sphere falling from various heights. The data is in good agreement with the predicted fall time of $\sqrt{2h/g}$, where h is the height and g is the free-fall acceleration due to gravity.

Near the surface of the Earth, an object in free fall in a vacuum will accelerate at approximately 9.8 m/s^{2}, independent of its mass. With air resistance acting on an object that has been dropped, the object will eventually reach a terminal velocity, which is around 53 m/s (190 km/h or 118 mph) for a human skydiver. The terminal velocity depends on many factors including mass, drag coefficient, and relative surface area and will only be achieved if the fall is from sufficient altitude. A typical skydiver in a spread-eagle position will reach terminal velocity after about 12 seconds, during which time they will have fallen around 450 m (1,500 ft).

Free fall was demonstrated on the Moon by astronaut David Scott on August 2, 1971. He simultaneously released a hammer and a feather from the same height above the Moon's surface. The hammer and the feather both fell at the same rate and hit the surface at the same time. This demonstrated Galileo's discovery that, in the absence of air resistance, all objects experience the same acceleration due to gravity. On the Moon, however, the gravitational acceleration is approximately 1.63 m/s^{2}, or only about ^{1}/_{6} that on Earth.

== Free fall in Newtonian mechanics ==
=== Uniform gravitational field without air resistance ===
This is the "textbook" case of the vertical motion of an object falling a small distance close to the surface of a planet. It is a good approximation in air as long as the force of gravity on the object is much greater than the force of air resistance, or equivalently the object's velocity is always much less than the terminal velocity (see below).

Free-fall

$v(t)=v_{0}-gt\,$ and

$$y(t)=v_{0}t+y_{0}-\frac{1}{2}gt^2 ,$$

where

$v_{0}\,$ is the initial vertical component of the velocity (m/s).
$v(t)\,$ is the vertical component of the velocity at $t\,$(m/s).
$y_{0}\,$ is the initial altitude (m).
$y(t)\,$ is the altitude at $t\,$(m).
$t\,$ is time elapsed (s).
$g\,$ is the acceleration due to gravity (9.81 m/s^{2} near the surface of the earth).

If the initial velocity is zero, then the distance fallen from the initial position will grow as the square of the elapsed time:

$v(t)=-gt$ and $y_{0}-y(t)=\frac{1}{2}gt^2.$

Moreover, because the odd numbers sum to the perfect squares, the distance fallen in successive time intervals grows as the odd numbers. This description of the behavior of falling bodies was given by Galileo.

=== Uniform gravitational field with air resistance ===
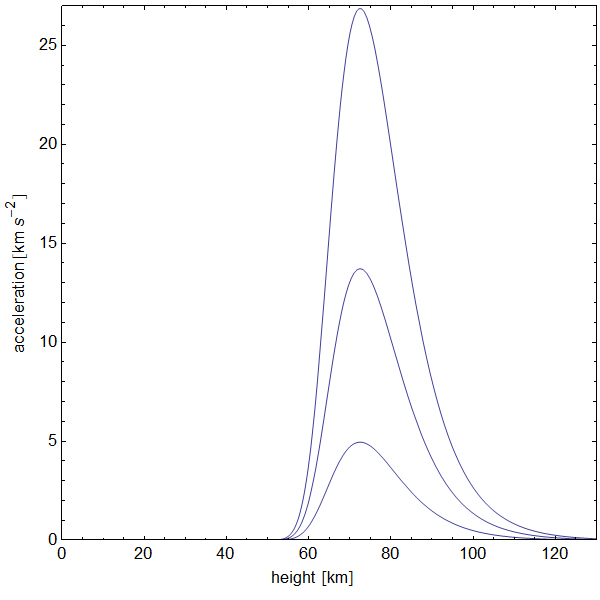
Acceleration of a small meteoroid when entering the Earth's atmosphere 80 km high (above which the Kennelly–Heaviside layer) at different initial velocities of 35, 25 and 15 km/s. Air pressure and air density are height-dependent.

This case applies to skydivers, parachutists or any body of mass, $m$, and cross-sectional area, $A,$ with Reynolds number $Re$ well above the critical Reynolds number, so that the air resistance is proportional to the square of the fall velocity, $v$,

It has an equation of vertical motion in Newton's regime

$$m\frac{\mathrm{d}v}{\mathrm{d}t}=mg-\tfrac{1}{2}\rho C_{\mathrm{D}}Av^2\,,$$

where $\rho$ is the air density and $C_{\mathrm{D}}$ is the drag coefficient, assumed to be constant ($Re>1000$) although in general it will depend on the Reynolds number.

Assuming an object falling from rest and no change in air density with altitude (ideal gas? $1/\rho=RT/p$), the solution is:

$$v(t)=v_{\infty}\tanh\left(\frac{gt}{v_{\infty}}\right),$$

where the terminal speed is given by

$$v_{\infty}=\sqrt{\frac{2mg}{\rho C_D A}}\,.$$

The object's speed versus time can be integrated over time to find the vertical position as a function of time:

$$y = y_0 + \frac{v_{\infty}^2}{g} \ln \cosh\left(\frac{gt}{v_\infty}\right).$$

Using the figure of 56 m/s for the terminal velocity of a human, one finds that after 10 seconds he will have fallen 348 metres and attained 94% of terminal velocity, and after 12 seconds he will have fallen 455 metres and will have attained 97% of terminal velocity. Gravity field is (vertical) position-dependent g(y): when $y_0\ll R,$ $g/g_o=1-2y_0/R.$ Linear decrease with height, small height compared to Earth's radius $R=$ 6379 km.

However, when the air density cannot be assumed to be constant, such as for objects falling from high altitude, the equation of motion becomes much more difficult to solve analytically and a numerical simulation of the motion is usually necessary. The figure shows the forces acting on small meteoroids falling through the Earth's upper atmosphere (an acceleration of 1.0 km/s² is $100g_0$). HALO jumps, including Joe Kittinger's and Felix Baumgartner's record jumps, also belong in this category.

=== Inverse-square law gravitational field ===
It can be said that two objects in space orbiting each other in the absence of other forces are in free fall around each other, e.g. that the Moon or an artificial satellite "falls around" the Earth, or a planet "falls around" the Sun. Assuming spherical objects means that the equation of motion is governed by Newton's law of universal gravitation, with solutions to the gravitational two-body problem being elliptic orbits obeying Kepler's laws of planetary motion. This connection between falling objects close to the Earth and orbiting objects is best illustrated by the thought experiment, Newton's cannonball.

The motion of two objects moving radially towards each other with no angular momentum can be considered a special case of an elliptical orbit of eccentricity e = 1 (radial elliptic trajectory). This allows one to compute the free-fall time for two point objects on a radial path. The solution of this equation of motion yields time as a function of separation:

$$t(y)=\sqrt{\tfrac{{y_0}^3}{2\mu}}\bigl(\sqrt{\tfrac{y}{y_0}\left(1-\tfrac{y}{y_0}\right)}+\arccos{\sqrt{\tfrac{y}{y_0}}}\bigr),$$

where

$t$ is the time after the start of the fall
$y$ is the distance between the centers of the bodies
$y_0$ is the initial value of $y$
$\mu = G(m_1 + m_2)$ is the standard gravitational parameter.

Substituting $y=0$ we get the free-fall time

$t_{\text{ff}}=\pi\sqrt{y_0^3/(8\mu)}$ and $t/t_{\text{ff}}=2/\pi\left(\sqrt{y_r\left(1-y_r\right)}+\arccos{\sqrt{y_r}}\right),$

which contains time t_{r} (dimensionless) and relative distance y_{r}(1↘0).

- The separation can be expressed explicitly as a function of time:

$y(t)=y_0~Q(1-\frac{t}{t_{\text{ff}}};\tfrac32,\tfrac12)~,$ where $Q(x;\alpha,\beta)$ is the quantile function of the beta distribution;

- also known as the inverse function of the regularized incomplete beta function $I_x(\alpha,\beta).$
- $I_x(\tfrac32,\tfrac12)=\tfrac{\Beta(x;\,\tfrac32,\tfrac12)}{\Beta(\tfrac32,\tfrac12)},$ with $B(x)=\int_0^x t^{1/2}\,(1-t)^{-1/2}\,dt=\int_0^x [t/(1-t)]^{1/2}\,dt$ and denominator: $\frac{\Gamma(\tfrac32)\,\Gamma(\tfrac12)}{\Gamma(2)}=\tfrac12\sqrt\pi\cdot\sqrt\pi/[\frac{3!}{(\tfrac32)!2^3}\sqrt\pi]=\tfrac23\sqrt\pi\cdot(\tfrac32)!$
- numerator: $\int_0^x 1/[\frac1t-1]^{1/2}\,dt=int(t=x)-int(t=0)$ with 0<t<1.

This solution can also be represented exactly by the analytic power series:

$$y(t)=\sum_{n=1}^{\infty}{\frac{x^n}{n!}}\cdot\lim_{r\to0}\bigl(\tfrac{\mathrm{d}^{\,n-1}}{\mathrm{d}r^{\,n-1}}\left[r^n\left(\tfrac72\bigl(\arcsin(\sqrt{r})-\sqrt{r-r^2}\bigr)\right)^{-\frac23n}\right]\bigr)=$$

$x/\lim_{r\to0}[\left(\tfrac72\bigl(\arcsin(\sqrt{r})-\sqrt{r-r^2}\bigr)\right)^{\frac23}]' + \tfrac{x^2}{2!}\lim_{r\to0}(\tfrac{\mathrm{d}^1}{\mathrm{d}r^1}\bigl[r^2\left(\tfrac72\bigl(\arcsin(\sqrt{r})-\sqrt{r-r^2}\bigr)\right)^{-\frac43}\bigr])$

$+\tfrac{x^3}{3!}\lim_{r\to0}\bigl(\tfrac{\mathrm{d}^2}{\mathrm{d}r^2}\left[r^3\left(\tfrac72\bigl(\arcsin(\sqrt{r})-\sqrt{r-r^2}\bigr)\right)^{-2}\right]\bigr)+\cdots$

Evaluating this yields:

$$y(t)/y_0=x-\tfrac{1}{5}x^2-\tfrac{3}{175}x^3-\tfrac{23}{7875}x^4-\tfrac{1894}{3,031875} x^5-\tfrac{3293}{21,896875}x^6-\tfrac{2,418092}{62,077,640625}x^7-\cdots$$

$=x-\tfrac15 x[x+(\tfrac37 x^2+\tfrac{23}{315}x^3+\tfrac{1894}{121,275}x^4+\tfrac{3293}{875,875}x^5+\tfrac{2,418092}{2,483,105625}x^6+\cdots)\tfrac15]$

$=x(1-\tfrac15 x[1+\tfrac{x}{5}(\tfrac37+\tfrac{x}{5}\bigl(\tfrac{23}{63}+\tfrac{1894}{24,255}x+\tfrac{3293}{175,175}x^2+\tfrac{2,418092}{496,621125}x^3\bigr)+\cdots)]),$

where

$x=\left[\tfrac32\left(\frac{\pi}{2}-t\sqrt{\tfrac{2\mu}{{y_0}^3}}\right)\right]^{2/3}=[\tfrac34\pi\cdot(1-t/t_{\text{ff}})]^{2/3}.$

This polynomial is difficult to achieve and not a workable solution.

== In general relativity ==
In general relativity, an object in free fall is subject to no force and is an inertial body moving along a geodesic. Far away from any sources of space-time curvature, where spacetime is flat, the Newtonian theory of free fall agrees with general relativity. Otherwise the two disagree; e.g., only general relativity can account for the precession of orbits, the orbital decay or inspiral of compact binaries due to gravitational waves, and the relativity of direction (geodetic precession and frame dragging).

The experimental observation that all objects in free fall accelerate at the same rate, as noted by Galileo (1590) and then embodied in Newton's theory as the equality of gravitational and inertial masses (1687) was later confirmed to high accuracy by modern forms of the Eötvös experiment (orig. 1885). It is the basis of the equivalence principle, from which basis Einstein's theory of general relativity initially took off.

== See also ==
- Dynamical time scale
- Equations for a falling body
- Free-fall time
- G-force
- High-altitude military parachuting
- Reduced-gravity aircraft
- Terminal velocity
- Weightlessness
