= Noemie Benczer Koller =

American nuclear physicist

- Born: August 21, 1933; Vienna, Austria
- Citizenship: United States
- Education: Barnard College (BA, 1953), Columbia University (MS, 1955) Columbia University (PhD, 1958)
- Spouse: Earl L. Koller
- Children: Daniel Koller, David Koller
- Scientific career
- Workplaces: Rutgers University
- Thesis: The Beta-radiation and Gamma-radiation of Bromine-82 and Rubidium-82 and the Energy Levels of Krypton-82 (1958)
- Website: http://www.physics.rutgers.edu/~nkoller/

Noemie Benczer Koller (born August 21, 1933) is a nuclear physicist. She was the first tenured female professor of Rutgers College.

== Early life and education ==
Koller was born Noemie Benczer in Vienna, Austria, on born August 21, 1933. Her father was a Ph.D. chemist and her mother worked as a bookbinder. The family moved frequently in her early childhood due to the turbulence of World War II. Her family moved from Vienna to Paris, and then subsequently moved further south in France several times to escape the German invasion. They subsequently emigrated to Cuba, and then to Mexico where she attended the Lycée Franco-Mexicain beginning in 1943. Upon completing high school at the Lycée in 1951, she traveled to New York to receive a college education. She was accepted into Barnard College, the women's college associated with Columbia University, which did not accept female applicants at the time. She entered Barnard with standing as a junior, as she received credit for the humanities courses at the Lycée, and was able to attain a B.A. in physics in two years. She entered graduate studies at Columbia University in 1953; she received her M.S. in 1955 and earned her Ph.D. in 1958 in experimental physics. She continued at Columbia as a postdoctoral research associate until 1960.

During her time at Barnard and Columbia, Koller worked as a laboratory assistant to Chien-Shiung Wu, an experimental physicist whose work focused on beta decay. Wu became a mentor and friend. Upon Wu's death, Koller spoke about her at the meeting of the American Physical Society; Koller later wrote a brief biography of Dr. Wu for the National Academy of Sciences. She has written that Wu was an "extremely careful experimentalist," and credits Wu with giving her a hands-on education with experimental technique.

== Career ==
In the fall of 1960, Koller was hired at Rutgers University, New Brunswick, NJ. She was the first woman hired in the Physics department; in 1965, she became the first tenured female professor of Rutgers College.

At Rutgers she has been a major member of the nuclear physics research group working on the tandem Van de Graaff accelerator, as well as a condensed-matter physicist, performing experiments using the Mössbauer effect, by which she investigated the electronic structure of magnetic materials.

According to the 'Contributions of 20th Century Women to Physics' (CWP) Project of the UCLA entry on Koller, Koller was a pioneer in several areas of nuclear and condensed matter physics, including the first identification of the double gamma decay of the observationally stable but theoretically unstable ^{40}Ca isotope to the ground state: a 0^{+} → 0^{+} transition; the observation of the interplay of single particle and collective motions in nuclei; and the description of a broad range of nuclear electromagnetic transitions in the rare earth region using a simple relation based on constant gyromagnetic ratios for nucleon pairs. Accordering to the Encyclopedia of World Scientists, she was the first person to directly measure the "magnetic moments of super-deformed nuclear states" and developed techniques "to study magnetic properties of nuclei far from the valley of stability."

Koller was active in administrative duties also. She served as a member of the Physics Advisory Panel, US National Science Foundation (1973–76), and of the Panel on Nuclear Physics, National Academy of Sciences Committee on Physics and Astronomy (1983–84). She was the director of the nuclear physics laboratory from 1986 to 1989. At Rutgers, Koller served in the administration of the university as the associate dean for sciences of the faculty of arts and sciences from 1992 to 1996, and was active in the American Physical Society (APS), serving on many national committees, as well as chair of the 2,500-member APS Nuclear Physics Division. Koller is a strong supporter of women in science and has contributed a significant amount of research to the physics community internationally.

== Personal life ==
While in graduate school at Columbia University in 1956, Noemie Benczer married fellow physics student Earl Leonard Koller. When Noemie took up her position at Rutgers, Earl was hired at the Stevens Institute of Technology in Hoboken, NJ. The Kollers had two sons, David, a geologist, and Daniel, a physicist.

== Awards and honors ==
- Fellow, American Physical Society, 1966
- New Jersey Women of Achievement Award, 1997
- Rutgers University Daniel Gorenstein Memorial Award, 2001
- Distinguished Service Award of the APS Division of Nuclear Physics, 2006
- Dwight Nicholson Medal for human outreach, American Physical Society, 2010
- Fellow, American Association for the Advancement of Science
