= Neodymium-doped gadolinium orthovanadate =

Laser gain medium

Neodymium-doped gadolinium orthovanadate, typically abbreviated as Nd:GdVO_{4}, is one of the active laser medium for diode laser-pumped solid-state lasers. Several advantages over Nd:YAG crystals include a larger emission cross-section, a pump power threshold, a wider absorption bandwidth, and a polarized output.

== Optical properties ==
The luminescence lifetime (spontaneous emission lifetime) is a function of Nd^{3+} ion concentration as seen in the table.

Nd concentration (atom %)	Luminescence lifetime (μs) @ 1064 nm	Reference
0.5	107	
0.9	97	
1.0	95	
1.2	90	
2.0	44	
