= Nano spray dryer =

Spray drying to create nanoparticles

Nano spray dryers refer to using spray drying to create particles in the nanometer range. Spray drying is a gentle method for producing powders with a defined particle size out of solutions, dispersions, and emulsions which is widely used for pharmaceuticals, food, biotechnology, and other industrial materials synthesis.

In the past, the limitations of spray drying were the particle size (minimum 2 micrometres), the yield (maximum around 70%), and the sample volume (minimum 50 ml for devices in lab scale). Recently, minimum particle sizes have been reduced to 300 nm, yields up to 90% are possible, and the sample amount can be as small as 1 ml. These expanded limits are possible due to new technological developments to the spray head, the heating system, and the electrostatic particle collector. To emphasize the small particle sizes possible with this new technology, it has been described as "nano" spray drying. However, the smallest particles produced are in the sub-micrometre range common to fine particles rather than the nanometer scale of ultrafine particles.

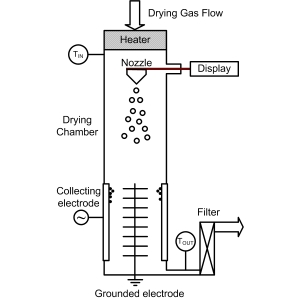
Functional principle of a nano spray dryer

== Functional principle ==
The functional principle is basically the same as with normal spray dryers. There are just different technologies that are used to do similar things.

The drying gas enters the system via the heater. A new kind of heater system allows for laminar air flow. The spray head sprays the fine droplets with a narrow size distribution into the drying chamber. The droplets dry and become solid particles. The solid particles are separated in the electrostatic particle collector. The [exhaust gas] is filtered and sent to a fume hood or the environment. The inlet temperature is controlled by a temperature sensor. and can be very dangerous also due to particulate matter

== Applications ==
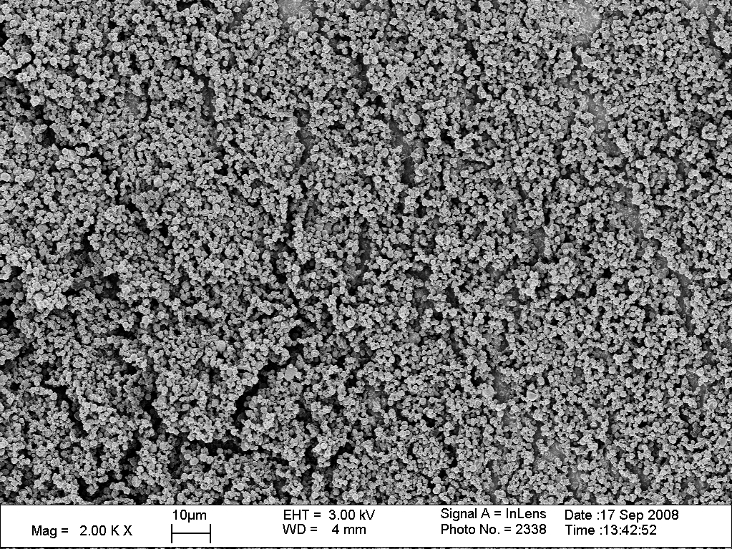
Scanning electron micrograph of gelatine particles spray dried with a nano spray dryer

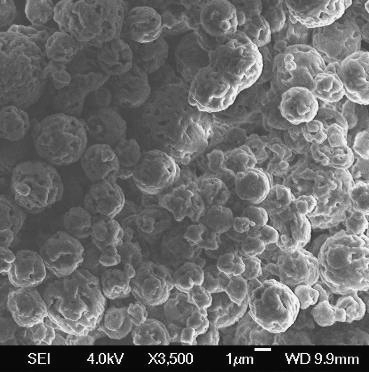
Scanning electron micrograph of grisofulvin particles spray dried with a nano spray dryer

Pharmaceuticals: This technique is widely used in the pharma market. Because of the small sample amounts and the high yields, it is ideal for spray drying expensive substances in basic research. The following list shows examples of what is possible:

- Inhalable drugs for dry powder inhalers (DPI‘s)
- Nano- and microencapsulation of liposomes
- Stabilization of heat-sensitive vaccines, insulin, growth hormones
- Encapsulation of nanoparticle drugs for high bioavailability
- Nanocapsules of biodegradable polymers (lactides, glycolides)
- Porous drug carriers for nanoparticle suspensions
- Excipients for controlled drug release studies: trehalose, mannitol, lactose, HPMC, PVA, chitosan, dextrin, PLGA, starch, gelatin

Materials science: This new technique offers new prospects in materials science, specially in the nanomaterial field. Now it is possible to spray dry fine particles. The following list shows examples of what is possible:

- Fine metal particles for novel catalysts
- Fine magnetic powders
- Carbon nanotubes as additives
- High performance ceramics with novel structures and high specific surface area
- Titanium oxide particles
- Nanoparticle suspensions for agglomeration
- Silicon oxide nanoparticle agglomerates
- Finest pigments for paints and coatings

Food: Also in the field of food science this technology offers new possibilities. Especially in the currently vibrant field of functional food, the following list shows examples of what is possible:

- Nano food – Functional additives
- Encapsulation of fruit aromas, flavours, or perfumes
- Spray drying of fine powder aromas for pet food
- Encapsulation of fish oil for smell protection
- Vitamins, other food additives, etc.

== Spray head ==
The spray head is one of the three new technologies that make "nano" spray drying possible. A piezoelectric system precisely vibrates a fine mesh. Vibration produces fine droplets with a narrow size distribution.

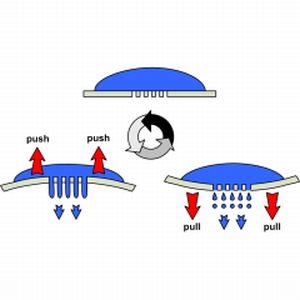
Vibrating mesh of a nano spray dryer spray head

== Heating system ==
In the field of "nano" spray drying a new heating system is used to provide the drying gas to produce the particles. The gas flow in the system is laminar and not turbulent as in common spray drying. The advantage of a laminar flow is that the particles fall straight down from the spray head and do not stick to the glass wall.

The laminar flow is produced by pressing the air through a porous metal foam.

== Electrostatic particle collector ==
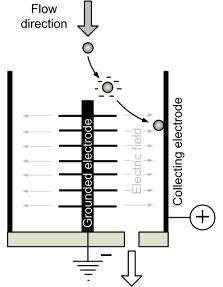
Functional principle of an electrostatic particle collector

To collect the very fine particles a new technology is used in the field of "nano" spray drying. The reason is that common cyclone technology depends on the particle mass; particles smaller than 2 μm can't be separated and instead exit the system along with the exhaust gas.

The electrostatic particle collector charges the dry particles' surface and deflects them with an electrical field. To produce the electrical field, a high voltage (16 kV) is applied to a round collector tube. The electrical field builds up between the inner wall of the collector tube and the tips of a grounded star electrode. To have a low level of energy in the system the current is very low.

After getting deflected the particles stay at the inner wall of the particle collector tube and are completely uncharged. This separation method works fine for all kinds of materials.

The efficiency of the electrostatic particle collector is very high: 99% of all particles that enter the system are collected.
