= Normal shock tables =

Calculations in aerodynamics

In aerodynamics, the normal shock tables are a series of tabulated data listing the various properties before and after the occurrence of a normal shock wave. With a given upstream Mach number, the post-shock Mach number can be calculated along with the pressure, density, temperature, and stagnation pressure ratios. Such tables are useful since the equations used to calculate the properties after a normal shock are cumbersome.

The tables below have been calculated using a heat capacity ratio, $\gamma$, equal to 1.4. The upstream Mach number, $M_1$, begins at 1 and ends at 5. Although the tables could be extended over any range of Mach numbers, stopping at Mach 5 is typical since assuming $\gamma$ to be 1.4 over the entire Mach number range leads to errors over 10% beyond Mach 5.

== Normal shock table equations ==
Given an upstream Mach number, $M_1$, and the ratio of specific heats, $\gamma$, the post normal shock Mach number, $M_2$, can be calculated using the equation below.

$$M_2 = \sqrt{\frac{M_1^2\left(\gamma - 1\right)+2}{2\gamma M_1^2 - \left(\gamma - 1\right)}}$$

The next equation shows the relationship between the post normal shock pressure, $p_2$, and the upstream ambient pressure, $p_1$.

$$\frac{p_2}{p_1} = \frac{2\gamma M_1^2}{\gamma + 1} - \frac{\gamma - 1}{\gamma + 1}$$

The relationship between the post normal shock density, $\rho_2$, and the upstream ambient density, $\rho_1$ is shown next in the tables.

$$\frac{\rho_2}{\rho_1} = \frac{\left(\gamma + 1\right)M_1^2}{\left(\gamma - 1\right)M_1^2 + 2}$$

Next, the equation below shows the relationship between the post normal shock temperature, $T_2$, and the upstream ambient temperature, $T_1$.

$$\frac{T_2}{T_1} = \frac{\left(1 + \frac{\gamma - 1}{2}M_1^2\right)\left(\frac{2\gamma}{\gamma - 1}M_1^2 - 1\right)}{M_1^2\left(\frac{2\gamma}{\gamma - 1} + \frac{\gamma - 1}{2}\right)}$$

Finally, the ratio of stagnation pressures is shown below where $p_{01}$ is the upstream stagnation pressure and $p_{02}$ occurs after the normal shock. The ratio of stagnation temperatures remains constant across a normal shock since the process is adiabatic.

$$\frac{p_{02}}{p_{01}} = \left(\frac{\frac{\gamma + 1}{2}M_1^2}{1 + \frac{\gamma - 1}{2}M_1^2}\right)^\frac{\gamma}{\gamma - 1}\left(\frac{1}{\frac{2\gamma}{\gamma + 1}M_1^2 - \frac{\gamma - 1}{\gamma + 1}}\right)^\frac{1}{\gamma - 1}$$

Note that before and after the shock the isentropic relations are valid and connect static and total quantities. That means, $p_{total}\neq p_{static} + p_{dynamic}$ (comes from Bernoulli, assumes incompressible flow) because the flow is for Mach numbers greater than unity always compressible.

== The normal shock tables (for γ = 1.4) ==
M_{1}	M_{2}	p_{2}/p_{1}	ρ_{2}/ρ_{1}	T_{2}/T_{1}	p_{02}/p_{01} D=DX
1.0100	0.9901	1.0235	1.0167	1.0066	1.0000
1.0200	0.9805	1.0471	1.0334	1.0132	1.0000
1.0300	0.9712	1.0711	1.0502	1.0198	1.0000
1.0400	0.9620	1.0952	1.0671	1.0263	0.9999
1.0500	0.9531	1.1196	1.0840	1.0328	0.9999
1.0600	0.9444	1.1442	1.1009	1.0393	0.9998
1.0700	0.9360	1.1691	1.1179	1.0458	0.9996
1.0800	0.9277	1.1941	1.1349	1.0522	0.9994
1.0900	0.9196	1.2195	1.1520	1.0586	0.9992
1.1000	0.9118	1.2450	1.1691	1.0649	0.9989
1.1100	0.9041	1.2708	1.1862	1.0713	0.9986
1.1200	0.8966	1.2968	1.2034	1.0776	0.9982
1.1300	0.8892	1.3231	1.2206	1.0840	0.9978
1.1400	0.8820	1.3495	1.2378	1.0903	0.9973
1.1500	0.8750	1.3763	1.2550	1.0966	0.9967
1.1600	0.8682	1.4032	1.2723	1.1029	0.9961
1.1700	0.8615	1.4304	1.2896	1.1092	0.9953
1.1800	0.8549	1.4578	1.3069	1.1154	0.9946
1.1900	0.8485	1.4855	1.3243	1.1217	0.9937
1.2000	0.8422	1.5133	1.3416	1.1280	0.9928
1.2100	0.8360	1.5415	1.3590	1.1343	0.9918
1.2200	0.8300	1.5698	1.3764	1.1405	0.9907
1.2300	0.8241	1.5984	1.3938	1.1468	0.9896
1.2400	0.8183	1.6272	1.4112	1.1531	0.9884
1.2500	0.8126	1.6563	1.4286	1.1594	0.9871
1.2600	0.8071	1.6855	1.4460	1.1657	0.9857
1.2700	0.8016	1.7151	1.4634	1.1720	0.9842
1.2800	0.7963	1.7448	1.4808	1.1783	0.9827
1.2900	0.7911	1.7748	1.4983	1.1846	0.9811
1.3000	0.7860	1.8050	1.5157	1.1909	0.9794
1.3100	0.7809	1.8355	1.5331	1.1972	0.9776
1.3200	0.7760	1.8661	1.5505	1.2035	0.9758
1.3300	0.7712	1.8971	1.5680	1.2099	0.9738
1.3400	0.7664	1.9282	1.5854	1.2162	0.9718
1.3500	0.7618	1.9596	1.6028	1.2226	0.9697
1.3600	0.7572	1.9912	1.6202	1.2290	0.9676
1.3700	0.7527	2.0231	1.6376	1.2354	0.9653
1.3800	0.7483	2.0551	1.6549	1.2418	0.9630
1.3900	0.7440	2.0875	1.6723	1.2482	0.9607
1.4000	0.7397	2.1200	1.6897	1.2547	0.9582
1.4100	0.7355	2.1528	1.7070	1.2612	0.9557
1.4200	0.7314	2.1858	1.7243	1.2676	0.9531
1.4300	0.7274	2.2191	1.7416	1.2741	0.9504
1.4400	0.7235	2.2525	1.7589	1.2807	0.9476
1.4500	0.7196	2.2863	1.7761	1.2872	0.9448
1.4600	0.7157	2.3202	1.7934	1.2938	0.9420
1.4700	0.7120	2.3544	1.8106	1.3003	0.9390
1.4800	0.7083	2.3888	1.8278	1.3069	0.9360
1.4900	0.7047	2.4235	1.8449	1.3136	0.9329
1.5000	0.7011	2.4583	1.8621	1.3202	0.9298
1.5100	0.6976	2.4935	1.8792	1.3269	0.9266
1.5200	0.6941	2.5288	1.8963	1.3336	0.9233
1.5300	0.6907	2.5644	1.9133	1.3403	0.9200
1.5400	0.6874	2.6002	1.9303	1.3470	0.9166
1.5500	0.6841	2.6363	1.9473	1.3538	0.9132
1.5600	0.6809	2.6725	1.9643	1.3606	0.9097
1.5700	0.6777	2.7091	1.9812	1.3674	0.9062
1.5800	0.6746	2.7458	1.9981	1.3742	0.9026
1.5900	0.6715	2.7828	2.0149	1.3811	0.8989
1.6000	0.6684	2.8200	2.0317	1.3880	0.8952
1.6100	0.6655	2.8575	2.0485	1.3949	0.8915
1.6200	0.6625	2.8951	2.0653	1.4018	0.8877
1.6300	0.6596	2.9331	2.0820	1.4088	0.8838
1.6400	0.6568	2.9712	2.0986	1.4158	0.8799
1.6500	0.6540	3.0096	2.1152	1.4228	0.8760
1.6600	0.6512	3.0482	2.1318	1.4299	0.8720
1.6700	0.6485	3.0871	2.1484	1.4369	0.8680
1.6800	0.6458	3.1261	2.1649	1.4440	0.8639
1.6900	0.6431	3.1655	2.1813	1.4512	0.8599
1.7000	0.6405	3.2050	2.1977	1.4583	0.8557
1.7100	0.6380	3.2448	2.2141	1.4655	0.8516
1.7200	0.6355	3.2848	2.2304	1.4727	0.8474
1.7300	0.6330	3.3251	2.2467	1.4800	0.8431
1.7400	0.6305	3.3655	2.2629	1.4873	0.8389
1.7500	0.6281	3.4063	2.2791	1.4946	0.8346
1.7600	0.6257	3.4472	2.2952	1.5019	0.8302
1.7700	0.6234	3.4884	2.3113	1.5093	0.8259
1.7800	0.6210	3.5298	2.3273	1.5167	0.8215
1.7900	0.6188	3.5715	2.3433	1.5241	0.8171
1.8000	0.6165	3.6133	2.3592	1.5316	0.8127
1.8100	0.6143	3.6555	2.3751	1.5391	0.8082
1.8200	0.6121	3.6978	2.3909	1.5466	0.8038
1.8300	0.6099	3.7404	2.4067	1.5541	0.7993
1.8400	0.6078	3.7832	2.4224	1.5617	0.7948
1.8500	0.6057	3.8263	2.4381	1.5693	0.7902
1.8600	0.6036	3.8695	2.4537	1.5770	0.7857
1.8700	0.6016	3.9131	2.4693	1.5847	0.7811
1.8800	0.5996	3.9568	2.4848	1.5924	0.7765
1.8900	0.5976	4.0008	2.5003	1.6001	0.7720
1.9000	0.5956	4.0450	2.5157	1.6079	0.7674
1.9100	0.5937	4.0895	2.5310	1.6157	0.7627
1.9200	0.5918	4.1341	2.5463	1.6236	0.7581
1.9300	0.5899	4.1791	2.5616	1.6314	0.7535
1.9400	0.5880	4.2242	2.5767	1.6394	0.7488
1.9500	0.5862	4.2696	2.5919	1.6473	0.7442
1.9600	0.5844	4.3152	2.6069	1.6553	0.7395
1.9700	0.5826	4.3611	2.6220	1.6633	0.7349
1.9800	0.5808	4.4071	2.6369	1.6713	0.7302
1.9900	0.5791	4.4535	2.6518	1.6794	0.7255
2.0000	0.5774	4.5000	2.6667	1.6875	0.7209
2.0100	0.5757	4.5468	2.6815	1.6956	0.7162
2.0200	0.5740	4.5938	2.6962	1.7038	0.7115
2.0300	0.5723	4.6411	2.7109	1.7120	0.7069
2.0400	0.5707	4.6885	2.7255	1.7203	0.7022
2.0500	0.5691	4.7363	2.7400	1.7285	0.6975
2.0600	0.5675	4.7842	2.7545	1.7369	0.6928
2.0700	0.5659	4.8324	2.7689	1.7452	0.6882
2.0800	0.5643	4.8808	2.7833	1.7536	0.6835
2.0900	0.5628	4.9294	2.7976	1.7620	0.6789
2.1000	0.5613	4.9783	2.8119	1.7705	0.6742
2.1100	0.5598	5.0274	2.8261	1.7789	0.6696
2.1200	0.5583	5.0768	2.8402	1.7875	0.6649
2.1300	0.5568	5.1264	2.8543	1.7960	0.6603
2.1400	0.5554	5.1762	2.8683	1.8046	0.6557
2.1500	0.5540	5.2262	2.8823	1.8132	0.6511
2.1600	0.5525	5.2765	2.8962	1.8219	0.6464
2.1700	0.5511	5.3270	2.9101	1.8306	0.6419
2.1800	0.5498	5.3778	2.9238	1.8393	0.6373
2.1900	0.5484	5.4288	2.9376	1.8481	0.6327
2.2000	0.5471	5.4800	2.9512	1.8569	0.6281
2.2100	0.5457	5.5314	2.9648	1.8657	0.6236
2.2200	0.5444	5.5831	2.9784	1.8746	0.6191
2.2300	0.5431	5.6350	2.9918	1.8835	0.6145
2.2400	0.5418	5.6872	3.0053	1.8924	0.6100
2.2500	0.5406	5.7396	3.0186	1.9014	0.6055
2.2600	0.5393	5.7922	3.0319	1.9104	0.6011
2.2700	0.5381	5.8450	3.0452	1.9194	0.5966
2.2800	0.5368	5.8981	3.0584	1.9285	0.5921
2.2900	0.5356	5.9514	3.0715	1.9376	0.5877
2.3000	0.5344	6.0050	3.0845	1.9468	0.5833
2.3100	0.5332	6.0588	3.0976	1.9560	0.5789
2.3200	0.5321	6.1128	3.1105	1.9652	0.5745
2.3300	0.5309	6.1670	3.1234	1.9745	0.5702
2.3400	0.5297	6.2215	3.1362	1.9838	0.5658
2.3500	0.5286	6.2762	3.1490	1.9931	0.5615
2.3600	0.5275	6.3312	3.1617	2.0025	0.5572
2.3700	0.5264	6.3864	3.1743	2.0119	0.5529
2.3800	0.5253	6.4418	3.1869	2.0213	0.5486
2.3900	0.5242	6.4974	3.1994	2.0308	0.5444
2.4000	0.5231	6.5533	3.2119	2.0403	0.5401
2.4100	0.5221	6.6094	3.2243	2.0499	0.5359
2.4200	0.5210	6.6658	3.2367	2.0595	0.5317
2.4300	0.5200	6.7224	3.2489	2.0691	0.5276
2.4400	0.5189	6.7792	3.2612	2.0788	0.5234
2.4500	0.5179	6.8362	3.2733	2.0885	0.5193
2.4600	0.5169	6.8935	3.2855	2.0982	0.5152
2.4700	0.5159	6.9510	3.2975	2.1080	0.5111
2.4800	0.5149	7.0088	3.3095	2.1178	0.5071
2.4900	0.5140	7.0668	3.3215	2.1276	0.5030
2.5000	0.5130	7.1250	3.3333	2.1375	0.4990
2.5100	0.5120	7.1834	3.3452	2.1474	0.4950
2.5200	0.5111	7.2421	3.3569	2.1574	0.4911
2.5300	0.5102	7.3010	3.3686	2.1674	0.4871
2.5400	0.5092	7.3602	3.3803	2.1774	0.4832
2.5500	0.5083	7.4196	3.3919	2.1875	0.4793
2.5600	0.5074	7.4792	3.4034	2.1976	0.4754
2.5700	0.5065	7.5390	3.4149	2.2077	0.4715
2.5800	0.5056	7.5991	3.4263	2.2179	0.4677
2.5900	0.5047	7.6594	3.4377	2.2281	0.4639
2.6000	0.5039	7.7200	3.4490	2.2383	0.4601
2.6100	0.5030	7.7808	3.4602	2.2486	0.4564
2.6200	0.5022	7.8418	3.4714	2.2590	0.4526
2.6300	0.5013	7.9030	3.4826	2.2693	0.4489
2.6400	0.5005	7.9645	3.4937	2.2797	0.4452
2.6500	0.4996	8.0262	3.5047	2.2902	0.4416
2.6600	0.4988	8.0882	3.5157	2.3006	0.4379
2.6700	0.4980	8.1504	3.5266	2.3111	0.4343
2.6800	0.4972	8.2128	3.5374	2.3217	0.4307
2.6900	0.4964	8.2754	3.5482	2.3323	0.4271
2.7000	0.4956	8.3383	3.5590	2.3429	0.4236
2.7100	0.4949	8.4014	3.5697	2.3536	0.4201
2.7200	0.4941	8.4648	3.5803	2.3642	0.4166
2.7300	0.4933	8.5284	3.5909	2.3750	0.4131
2.7400	0.4926	8.5922	3.6015	2.3858	0.4097
2.7500	0.4918	8.6562	3.6119	2.3966	0.4062
2.7600	0.4911	8.7205	3.6224	2.4074	0.4028
2.7700	0.4903	8.7850	3.6327	2.4183	0.3994
2.7800	0.4896	8.8498	3.6431	2.4292	0.3961
2.7900	0.4889	8.9148	3.6533	2.4402	0.3928
2.8000	0.4882	8.9800	3.6636	2.4512	0.3895
2.8100	0.4875	9.0454	3.6737	2.4622	0.3862
2.8200	0.4868	9.1111	3.6838	2.4733	0.3829
2.8300	0.4861	9.1770	3.6939	2.4844	0.3797
2.8400	0.4854	9.2432	3.7039	2.4955	0.3765
2.8500	0.4847	9.3096	3.7139	2.5067	0.3733
2.8600	0.4840	9.3762	3.7238	2.5179	0.3701
2.8700	0.4833	9.4430	3.7336	2.5292	0.3670
2.8800	0.4827	9.5101	3.7434	2.5405	0.3639
2.8900	0.4820	9.5774	3.7532	2.5518	0.3608
2.9000	0.4814	9.6450	3.7629	2.5632	0.3577
2.9100	0.4807	9.7128	3.7725	2.5746	0.3547
2.9200	0.4801	9.7808	3.7821	2.5861	0.3517
2.9300	0.4795	9.8490	3.7917	2.5976	0.3487
2.9400	0.4788	9.9175	3.8012	2.6091	0.3457
2.9500	0.4782	9.9862	3.8106	2.6206	0.3428
2.9600	0.4776	10.0552	3.8200	2.6322	0.3398
2.9700	0.4770	10.1244	3.8294	2.6439	0.3369
2.9800	0.4764	10.1938	3.8387	2.6555	0.3340
2.9900	0.4758	10.2634	3.8479	2.6673	0.3312
3.0000	0.4752	10.3333	3.8571	2.6790	0.3283
3.0100	0.4746	10.4034	3.8663	2.6908	0.3255
3.0200	0.4740	10.4738	3.8754	2.7026	0.3227
3.0300	0.4734	10.5444	3.8845	2.7145	0.3200
3.0400	0.4729	10.6152	3.8935	2.7264	0.3172
3.0500	0.4723	10.6862	3.9025	2.7383	0.3145
3.0600	0.4717	10.7575	3.9114	2.7503	0.3118
3.0700	0.4712	10.8290	3.9203	2.7623	0.3091
3.0800	0.4706	10.9008	3.9291	2.7744	0.3065
3.0900	0.4701	10.9728	3.9379	2.7865	0.3038
3.1000	0.4695	11.0450	3.9466	2.7986	0.3012
3.1100	0.4690	11.1174	3.9553	2.8108	0.2986
3.1200	0.4685	11.1901	3.9639	2.8230	0.2960
3.1300	0.4679	11.2630	3.9725	2.8352	0.2935
3.1400	0.4674	11.3362	3.9811	2.8475	0.2910
3.1500	0.4669	11.4096	3.9896	2.8598	0.2885
3.1600	0.4664	11.4832	3.9981	2.8722	0.2860
3.1700	0.4659	11.5570	4.0065	2.8846	0.2835
3.1800	0.4654	11.6311	4.0149	2.8970	0.2811
3.1900	0.4648	11.7054	4.0232	2.9095	0.2786
3.2000	0.4643	11.7800	4.0315	2.9220	0.2762
3.2100	0.4639	11.8548	4.0397	2.9345	0.2738
3.2200	0.4634	11.9298	4.0479	2.9471	0.2715
3.2300	0.4629	12.0050	4.0561	2.9598	0.2691
3.2400	0.4624	12.0805	4.0642	2.9724	0.2668
3.2500	0.4619	12.1562	4.0723	2.9851	0.2645
3.2600	0.4614	12.2322	4.0803	2.9979	0.2622
3.2700	0.4610	12.3084	4.0883	3.0106	0.2600
3.2800	0.4605	12.3848	4.0963	3.0234	0.2577
3.2900	0.4600	12.4614	4.1042	3.0363	0.2555
3.3000	0.4596	12.5383	4.1120	3.0492	0.2533
3.3100	0.4591	12.6154	4.1198	3.0621	0.2511
3.3200	0.4587	12.6928	4.1276	3.0751	0.2489
3.3300	0.4582	12.7704	4.1354	3.0881	0.2468
3.3400	0.4578	12.8482	4.1431	3.1011	0.2446
3.3500	0.4573	12.9262	4.1507	3.1142	0.2425
3.3600	0.4569	13.0045	4.1583	3.1273	0.2404
3.3700	0.4565	13.0830	4.1659	3.1405	0.2383
3.3800	0.4560	13.1618	4.1734	3.1537	0.2363
3.3900	0.4556	13.2408	4.1809	3.1669	0.2342
3.4000	0.4552	13.3200	4.1884	3.1802	0.2322
3.4100	0.4548	13.3994	4.1958	3.1935	0.2302
3.4200	0.4544	13.4791	4.2032	3.2069	0.2282
3.4300	0.4540	13.5590	4.2105	3.2203	0.2263
3.4400	0.4535	13.6392	4.2179	3.2337	0.2243
3.4500	0.4531	13.7196	4.2251	3.2472	0.2224
3.4600	0.4527	13.8002	4.2323	3.2607	0.2205
3.4700	0.4523	13.8810	4.2395	3.2742	0.2186
3.4800	0.4519	13.9621	4.2467	3.2878	0.2167
3.4900	0.4515	14.0434	4.2538	3.3014	0.2148
3.5000	0.4512	14.1250	4.2609	3.3151	0.2129
3.5100	0.4508	14.2068	4.2679	3.3287	0.2111
3.5200	0.4504	14.2888	4.2749	3.3425	0.2093
3.5300	0.4500	14.3710	4.2819	3.3563	0.2075
3.5400	0.4496	14.4535	4.2888	3.3701	0.2057
3.5500	0.4492	14.5362	4.2957	3.3839	0.2039
3.5600	0.4489	14.6192	4.3026	3.3978	0.2022
3.5700	0.4485	14.7024	4.3094	3.4117	0.2004
3.5800	0.4481	14.7858	4.3162	3.4257	0.1987
3.5900	0.4478	14.8694	4.3229	3.4397	0.1970
3.6000	0.4474	14.9533	4.3296	3.4537	0.1953
3.6100	0.4471	15.0374	4.3363	3.4678	0.1936
3.6200	0.4467	15.1218	4.3429	3.4819	0.1920
3.6300	0.4463	15.2064	4.3496	3.4961	0.1903
3.6400	0.4460	15.2912	4.3561	3.5103	0.1887
3.6500	0.4456	15.3762	4.3627	3.5245	0.1871
3.6600	0.4453	15.4615	4.3692	3.5388	0.1855
3.6700	0.4450	15.5470	4.3756	3.5531	0.1839
3.6800	0.4446	15.6328	4.3821	3.5674	0.1823
3.6900	0.4443	15.7188	4.3885	3.5818	0.1807
3.7000	0.4439	15.8050	4.3949	3.5962	0.1792
3.7100	0.4436	15.8914	4.4012	3.6107	0.1777
3.7200	0.4433	15.9781	4.4075	3.6252	0.1761
3.7300	0.4430	16.0650	4.4138	3.6397	0.1746
3.7400	0.4426	16.1522	4.4200	3.6543	0.1731
3.7500	0.4423	16.2396	4.4262	3.6689	0.1717
3.7600	0.4420	16.3272	4.4324	3.6836	0.1702
3.7700	0.4417	16.4150	4.4385	3.6983	0.1687
3.7800	0.4414	16.5031	4.4447	3.7130	0.1673
3.7900	0.4410	16.5914	4.4507	3.7278	0.1659
3.8000	0.4407	16.6800	4.4568	3.7426	0.1645
3.8100	0.4404	16.7688	4.4628	3.7575	0.1631
3.8200	0.4401	16.8578	4.4688	3.7723	0.1617
3.8300	0.4398	16.9470	4.4747	3.7873	0.1603
3.8400	0.4395	17.0365	4.4807	3.8022	0.1589
3.8500	0.4392	17.1262	4.4866	3.8172	0.1576
3.8600	0.4389	17.2162	4.4924	3.8323	0.1563
3.8700	0.4386	17.3064	4.4983	3.8473	0.1549
3.8800	0.4383	17.3968	4.5041	3.8625	0.1536
3.8900	0.4380	17.4874	4.5098	3.8776	0.1523
3.9000	0.4377	17.5783	4.5156	3.8928	0.1510
3.9100	0.4375	17.6694	4.5213	3.9080	0.1497
3.9200	0.4372	17.7608	4.5270	3.9233	0.1485
3.9300	0.4369	17.8524	4.5326	3.9386	0.1472
3.9400	0.4366	17.9442	4.5383	3.9540	0.1460
3.9500	0.4363	18.0362	4.5439	3.9694	0.1448
3.9600	0.4360	18.1285	4.5494	3.9848	0.1435
3.9700	0.4358	18.2210	4.5550	4.0003	0.1423
3.9800	0.4355	18.3138	4.5605	4.0158	0.1411
3.9900	0.4352	18.4068	4.5660	4.0313	0.1399
4.0000	0.4350	18.5000	4.5714	4.0469	0.1388
4.0100	0.4347	18.5934	4.5769	4.0625	0.1376
4.0200	0.4344	18.6871	4.5823	4.0782	0.1364
4.0300	0.4342	18.7810	4.5876	4.0938	0.1353
4.0400	0.4339	18.8752	4.5930	4.1096	0.1342
4.0500	0.4336	18.9696	4.5983	4.1254	0.1330
4.0600	0.4334	19.0642	4.6036	4.1412	0.1319
4.0700	0.4331	19.1590	4.6089	4.1570	0.1308
4.0800	0.4329	19.2541	4.6141	4.1729	0.1297
4.0900	0.4326	19.3494	4.6193	4.1888	0.1286
4.1000	0.4324	19.4450	4.6245	4.2048	0.1276
4.1100	0.4321	19.5408	4.6296	4.2208	0.1265
4.1200	0.4319	19.6368	4.6348	4.2368	0.1254
4.1300	0.4316	19.7330	4.6399	4.2529	0.1244
4.1400	0.4314	19.8295	4.6450	4.2690	0.1234
4.1500	0.4311	19.9262	4.6500	4.2852	0.1223
4.1600	0.4309	20.0232	4.6550	4.3014	0.1213
4.1700	0.4306	20.1204	4.6601	4.3176	0.1203
4.1800	0.4304	20.2178	4.6650	4.3339	0.1193
4.1900	0.4302	20.3154	4.6700	4.3502	0.1183
4.2000	0.4299	20.4133	4.6749	4.3666	0.1173
4.2100	0.4297	20.5114	4.6798	4.3830	0.1164
4.2200	0.4295	20.6098	4.6847	4.3994	0.1154
4.2300	0.4292	20.7084	4.6896	4.4159	0.1144
4.2400	0.4290	20.8072	4.6944	4.4324	0.1135
4.2500	0.4288	20.9062	4.6992	4.4489	0.1126
4.2600	0.4286	21.0055	4.7040	4.4655	0.1116
4.2700	0.4283	21.1050	4.7087	4.4821	0.1107
4.2800	0.4281	21.2048	4.7135	4.4988	0.1098
4.2900	0.4279	21.3048	4.7182	4.5155	0.1089
4.3000	0.4277	21.4050	4.7229	4.5322	0.1080
4.3100	0.4275	21.5054	4.7275	4.5490	0.1071
4.3200	0.4272	21.6061	4.7322	4.5658	0.1062
4.3300	0.4270	21.7070	4.7368	4.5827	0.1054
4.3400	0.4268	21.8082	4.7414	4.5995	0.1045
4.3500	0.4266	21.9096	4.7460	4.6165	0.1036
4.3600	0.4264	22.0112	4.7505	4.6334	0.1028
4.3700	0.4262	22.1130	4.7550	4.6505	0.1020
4.3800	0.4260	22.2151	4.7595	4.6675	0.1011
4.3900	0.4258	22.3174	4.7640	4.6846	0.1003
4.4000	0.4255	22.4200	4.7685	4.7017	0.0995
4.4100	0.4253	22.5228	4.7729	4.7189	0.0987
4.4200	0.4251	22.6258	4.7773	4.7361	0.0979
4.4300	0.4249	22.7290	4.7817	4.7533	0.0971
4.4400	0.4247	22.8325	4.7861	4.7706	0.0963
4.4500	0.4245	22.9362	4.7904	4.7879	0.0955
4.4600	0.4243	23.0402	4.7948	4.8053	0.0947
4.4700	0.4241	23.1444	4.7991	4.8227	0.0940
4.4800	0.4239	23.2488	4.8034	4.8401	0.0932
4.4900	0.4237	23.3534	4.8076	4.8576	0.0924
4.5000	0.4236	23.4583	4.8119	4.8751	0.0917
4.5100	0.4234	23.5634	4.8161	4.8926	0.0910
4.5200	0.4232	23.6688	4.8203	4.9102	0.0902
4.5300	0.4230	23.7744	4.8245	4.9279	0.0895
4.5400	0.4228	23.8802	4.8287	4.9455	0.0888
4.5500	0.4226	23.9862	4.8328	4.9632	0.0881
4.5600	0.4224	24.0925	4.8369	4.9810	0.0874
4.5700	0.4222	24.1990	4.8410	4.9987	0.0867
4.5800	0.4220	24.3058	4.8451	5.0166	0.0860
4.5900	0.4219	24.4128	4.8492	5.0344	0.0853
4.6000	0.4217	24.5200	4.8532	5.0523	0.0846
4.6100	0.4215	24.6274	4.8572	5.0703	0.0839
4.6200	0.4213	24.7351	4.8612	5.0882	0.0832
4.6300	0.4211	24.8430	4.8652	5.1063	0.0826
4.6400	0.4210	24.9512	4.8692	5.1243	0.0819
4.6500	0.4208	25.0596	4.8731	5.1424	0.0813
4.6600	0.4206	25.1682	4.8771	5.1605	0.0806
4.6700	0.4204	25.2770	4.8810	5.1787	0.0800
4.6800	0.4203	25.3861	4.8849	5.1969	0.0793
4.6900	0.4201	25.4954	4.8887	5.2151	0.0787
4.7000	0.4199	25.6050	4.8926	5.2334	0.0781
4.7100	0.4197	25.7148	4.8964	5.2518	0.0775
4.7200	0.4196	25.8248	4.9002	5.2701	0.0769
4.7300	0.4194	25.9350	4.9040	5.2885	0.0762
4.7400	0.4192	26.0455	4.9078	5.3070	0.0756
4.7500	0.4191	26.1562	4.9116	5.3254	0.0750
4.7600	0.4189	26.2672	4.9153	5.3440	0.0745
4.7700	0.4187	26.3784	4.9190	5.3625	0.0739
4.7800	0.4186	26.4898	4.9227	5.3811	0.0733
4.7900	0.4184	26.6014	4.9264	5.3997	0.0727
4.8000	0.4183	26.7133	4.9301	5.4184	0.0721
4.8100	0.4181	26.8254	4.9338	5.4371	0.0716
4.8200	0.4179	26.9378	4.9374	5.4559	0.0710
4.8300	0.4178	27.0504	4.9410	5.4747	0.0705
4.8400	0.4176	27.1632	4.9446	5.4935	0.0699
4.8500	0.4175	27.2762	4.9482	5.5124	0.0694
4.8600	0.4173	27.3895	4.9518	5.5313	0.0688
4.8700	0.4172	27.5030	4.9553	5.5502	0.0683
4.8800	0.4170	27.6168	4.9589	5.5692	0.0677
4.8900	0.4169	27.7308	4.9624	5.5882	0.0672
4.9000	0.4167	27.8450	4.9659	5.6073	0.0667
4.9100	0.4165	27.9594	4.9694	5.6264	0.0662
4.9200	0.4164	28.0741	4.9728	5.6455	0.0657
4.9300	0.4163	28.1890	4.9763	5.6647	0.0652
4.9400	0.4161	28.3042	4.9797	5.6839	0.0647
4.9500	0.4160	28.4196	4.9831	5.7032	0.0642
4.9600	0.4158	28.5352	4.9865	5.7224	0.0637
4.9700	0.4157	28.6510	4.9899	5.7418	0.0632
4.9800	0.4155	28.7671	4.9933	5.7611	0.0627
4.9900	0.4154	28.8834	4.9967	5.7806	0.0622
5.0000	0.4152	29.0000	5.0000	5.8000	0.0617

== See also ==
- Normal shock
- Mach number
- Compressible flow
