= Neutron capture nucleosynthesis =

Two nucleosynthesis pathways

Neutron capture nucleosynthesis describes two nucleosynthesis pathways: the r-process and the s-process, for rapid and slow neutron captures, respectively. R-process describes neutron capture in a region of high neutron flux, such as during supernova nucleosynthesis after core-collapse, and yields neutron-rich nuclides. S-process describes neutron capture that is slow relative to the rate of beta decay, as for stellar nucleosynthesis in some stars, and yields nuclei with stable nuclear shells. Each process is responsible for roughly half of the observed abundances of elements heavier than iron. The importance of neutron capture to the observed abundance of the chemical elements was first described in 1957 in the B^{2}FH paper.
