= Nuclear fuel cycle information system =

International Atomic Energy Agency database

The Nuclear Fuel Cycle Information System (NFCIS) is an international database of civilian and commercial nuclear fuel cycles maintained by the International Atomic Energy Agency (IAEA). The NFCIS is one of the five databases that comprise the Integrated Nuclear Fuel Cycle Information System. The NFCIS is a database that is housed by the International Atomic Energy Agency (IAEA). According to the IAEA website, on Jun 14, 2016, the NFCIS held information pertaining to 650 different facilities, located in 54 countries throughout the world. The Nuclear Fuel Cycle Information System's information comes from countries that are members of the IAEA and other public information sources. The IAEA's Nuclear Fuel Cycle Information System is considered a nuclear safeguard.

The NFC Information System database has evolved since its original development during the 1980s. The current layout of the database provides information on the types of facilities currently monitored and facilities that are intended to be monitored in the future, by the IAEA's Nuclear Fuel Cycle database. Other information that is stored within the database includes: the operational activities at each facility, as well as, what level of production operations are occurring at each particular plant. Short descriptions of facilities that are participating in the Nuclear Fuel Cycle Information System is also included. The information is gathered through questionnaires that participating countries respond to, every few years, regarding their nuclear fuel storage and production facilities.

== Purpose of the NFCIS ==
The primary objective of the NFCIS is to provide the IAEA, its member states, and members of the general public with accurate information about the past, present, and future operations of nuclear fuel cycle facilities around the world. More broadly, the NFCIS contributes to the IAEAs aims of facilitating the peaceful maintenance of atomic energy around the world

== History of the Nuclear Fuel Cycle Information System ==
NFCIS was created during the 1980s. The NFCIS was a necessary program introduced by the IAEA since nuclear fuel had been discovered and many countries were starting to produce and stock this material. There was no way to return to a life without them. This database could help the International Atomic Energy Agency maintain an element of control over these hazardous weapons and allow one system to monitor the worldwide supply. Since its inception, the database has undergone various updates, beginning in 1985 when the database was computerized. Most recently, in 1998, the NFCIS was updated to optimize internet access. In its current iteration, the NFCIS consists of a structural database on a server. Users can query results through a series of search options.

== The Nuclear Fuel Cycle ==
The nuclear fuel cycle involves the whole process of developing and preparing nuclear energy. It begins with the mining of the ore, followed by the transformation of these substances into nuclear fuel in the nuclear power plants. The nuclear fuel cycle also involves the disposal and monitoring of nuclear waste within these facilities.

== The International Atomic Energy Agency (IAEA) ==
The International Atomic Energy Agency was founded in 1957 as nuclear energy was continuing to be developed, and governments and their people had growing concerns about the potential of nuclear energy threats around the world. The headquarters were installed in Vienna, Austria. Since 1957 the IAEA has implemented additional offices in Toronto, Canada, Tokyo, Japan, New York City, United States of America, and Geneva, Switzerland. The goal of the International Atomic Energy Agency is to maintain nuclear technology around the world in a safe, controlled and peaceful manner. The organization works alongside the United Nations to meet their goals and maintain their desired level of security. The database, known as the Nuclear Fuel Cycle Information System (NFCIS) is also maintained by the IAEA.

== See also ==
- Integrated Nuclear Fuel Cycle Information System
