= Narrow bipolar pulse =

Intra-cloud electrical discharges associated with thunderstorms

Narrow bipolar pulses are high-energy, high-altitude, intra-cloud electrical discharges associated with thunderstorms. NBP are similar to other forms of lightning events such as return strokes and dart leaders, but produce an optical emission of at least an order of magnitude smaller. They typically occur in the 10–20 km altitude range and can emit a power on the order of a few hundred gigawatts. They produce far-field asymmetric bipolar electric field change signatures (called narrow bipolar events).

Narrow Bipolar Event: Electric Field (V/m) versus time (microseconds)
