= Nikolay Pilchikov =

Russian physicist and inventor

Mykola Dmytroych Pylchykov
- Микола Дмитрович Пильчиков
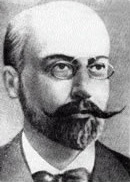
- Born: 21 May 1857; Kharkiv, Russian Empire
- Died: 19 May 1908 (aged 50); Kharkiv, Russian Empire
- Occupations: Physicist, inventor, geologist
- Known for: Discovery of the photovoltaic effect, new properties of X-rays

Mykola Dmytroych Pylchykov (Ukrainian: Микола Дмитрович Пильчиков, 21 May 1857, Kharkiv, Russian Empire (present-day Kharkiv, Ukraine) – 19 May 1908, Kharkiv, Russian Empire) was a physicist, inventor, and geologist in the Russian Empire. He is known for the discovery of the photovoltaic effect, new properties of X-rays, and ways to control various mechanisms of the radio provided a basis of radio control.

Pylchykov discovered the phenomenon of electronic photography and determined its principles, conducted fundamental research of atmospheric ionisation and light polarisation, and designed many ingenious devices and appliances, many of which carry his name, including the prototype of the modern protective suit for astronauts.

Pylchykov was also well-known as a researcher of the Kursk Magnetic Anomaly.

Mykola Dmytroych Pylchykov was a son of Dmytro Pylchykov, one of members of the Brotherhood of Saints Cyril and Methodius. Father was a Ukrainian patriot, public and cultural figure, taught history and political economy in the Poltava Cadet Corps. Under the guidance of his father, Mykola learned 7 languages, including Ukrainian and Polish literature, and immediately before entering the Poltava gymnasium, he also studied Russian and was admitted to the 4th grade.

Pylchykov was a member of the Toulouse Academy of Sciences.

He played the violin, was engaged in painting, knew 7 languages, wrote and published poems in the Ukrainian language in the magazine "Skladka" under the pseudonym M.P., because until 1905 the Ukrainian printed language was banned by the Russian Empire in Ukraine.
