= Nucifer experiment =

Test for monitoring nuclear reactors

The Nucifer Experiment is a proposed test of equipment and methodologies for using neutrino detection (or, more specifically, antineutrino detection) for the monitoring of nuclear reactor activity and the assessment of the isotopic composition of reactor fuels for non-proliferation treaty compliance monitoring. Based upon an idea proposed by L.A. Mikaélyan in 1977, the Nucifer Experiment was proposed to the IAEA in October 2008.

The Nucifer Collaboration consists of researchers from a variety of French research institutions, including Subatech and CEA Saclay and from the Max-Planck-Institut für Kernphysik in Heidelberg, Germany. No information appears to be available regarding the origin of the name "Nucifer". It is sometimes published in all-caps ("NUCIFER"), implying that it might be an acronym, but this usage is not consistent, not even among publications and presentations written by participants in the project.

== Background ==
Following the 1977 suggestion by Mikaélyan and his collaborators of using neutrino detection for nuclear monitoring, little work was pursued regarding implementation of the concept until researchers from the Lawrence Livermore and Sandia National Laboratories constructed a prototype antineutrino detector using 0.64 ton of Gadolinium-doped liquid scintillator and placed it 25 m from the core of the San Onofre Nuclear Generating Station (SONGS) in California. At an October 2008 meeting of the IAEA Novel Technologies group in Vienna, the results of the SONGS experiment were reviewed and found to demonstrate the potential for the approach. At that same meeting, participants in the Nucifer collaboration presented their proposal to construct a similar but improved detector. Their proposal included the results of extensive simulations illustrating the viability of the approach and is currently being evaluated by that body as a potential safeguard against nuclear weapons proliferation.

== Detector design ==
The design criteria specified by the IAEA call for a reactor monitoring tool which is compact, portable, inexpensive, safe, and remotely controllable. It should be possible to unobtrusively place such a monitoring device near a nuclear reactor, without adversely impacting the safe operation of that reactor, and remotely monitor for indications of the production of nuclear materials intended for weapons applications in violation of international non-proliferation treaties. For example, the detection of a change in the antineutrino spectrum consistent with the removal of a large quantity of ^{239}Pu from the reactor would raise suspicions and warrant further investigation.

The proposed detector consists of a cylindrical steel tank containing one ton of Gd-doped liquid scintillator material and 16 8" photomultiplier tubes separated from the scintillator material by a 25-cm thick acrylic disk. The entire apparatus is surrounded by layers of lead and polyethylene to provide shielding against background radiation. Between the detection tank and the shielding is a plastic scintillator muon detector designed to detect the presence of muons produced by the decay of pions from cosmic radiation. If triggered, this muon-veto device tags any signal picked up by the photomultiplier tubes within the tank, and such signals would be excluded from calculations as likely not being created by the reactor. The overall footprint of the device is 2.5 x 2.5 m^{2}.

== Planned milestones ==
- Integration tests at the Saclay ALS shallow depth lab, which has been ongoing since 2010.
- Detector installation and testing at the CEA-Saclay Osiris research reactor (2011-2012).
- Detector installation and testing at the ILL research reactor at Grenoble for calibration of the pure ^{235}U ν spectrum.
- Detector installation and testing at a commercial nuclear reactor. (2013)

== Reactor antineutrino anomaly ==
One potential issue which will have to be addressed by the Nucifer experiment is an anomaly in the existing body of data regarding the neutrino/antineutrino flux from nuclear reactors around the world. Measured values of this flux appears to be only 94% of the value expected from theory. It is unknown whether this is due to unknown physics (with weak mixing with sterile neutrinos being put forth as a possible explanation by some researchers), experimental error in the measurements, or errors in the theoretical flux calculations. In any case, the Nucifer collaborators will be looking for this effect, and will have to take it into consideration in their calibrations.
