= Nuts & Bolts (film) =

Hochbetrieb
- Directed by: Andreas Krein
- Produced by: Oliver Fink
- Cinematography: Felix Cramer
- Edited by: Anja Rosin
- Music by: Stefan Ziethen
- Distributed by: Filmakademie Baden-Württemberg
- Release date: 2003
- Running time: 6 minutes
- Country: Germany

Hochbetrieb (Nuts & Bolts in English) is a silent slapstick short film, directed by Andreas Krein. It received a Menzione Speciale (Special Mention) at the Venice Film Festival - "For having paid a tribute to Harold Lloyd, who shall not be forgotten, by means of modern technology." Set on top of a high-rise construction site in the 1930s, the movie depicts the antics of a foreman and his apprentice while hunting for a frog and stolen food.

The film was shot entirely in front of bluescreen in 2001. Principal photography was followed by two years of post production to create a CG construction site and city environment, the latter generated procedurally in part. After its release, Hochbetrieb screened at the TriBeCa Film Festival and the Berlinale Kinderfilmfest. It won the German Federal Film Board's short film award, Short Tiger, and the Friedrich Wilhelm Murnau Shortfilm Award.

2004 it received theatrical release as part of a feature-length short film compilation, and it was part of a special screening with a focus on silent cinema at the Museum of Modern Art in 2008.
