= Nuclear Instruments and Methods in Physics Research =

- Discipline: Physics
- Language: English

Publication details
- Former names: Nuclear Instruments and Methods; Nuclear Instruments
- History: 1984–present
- Publisher: Elsevier

Standard abbreviations
- ISO 4: Nucl. Instrum. Methods Phys. Res.

Indexing
- ISSN: 0168-9002

Links
- Journal homepage

Nuclear Instruments and Methods in Physics Research Section A: Accelerators, Spectrometers, Detectors and Associated Equipment
- Discipline: Physics
- Language: English

Publication details
- History: 1984–present
- Publisher: Elsevier
- Impact factor: 1.455 (2020)

Standard abbreviations
- ISO 4: Nucl. Instrum. Methods Phys. Res. A

Indexing
- ISSN: 0168-9002

Links
- Journal homepage

Nuclear Instruments and Methods in Physics Research Section B: Beam Interactions with Materials and Atoms
- Discipline: Physics
- Language: English

Publication details
- History: 1984–present
- Publisher: Elsevier
- Impact factor: 1.377 (2020)

Standard abbreviations
- ISO 4: Nucl. Instrum. Methods Phys. Res. B

Indexing
- ISSN: 0168-583X

Links
- Journal homepage

Nuclear Instruments and Methods in Physics Research (Nucl. Instrum. Methods Phys. Res.) is a peer-reviewed scientific journal published by Elsevier. It was established in 1957 as Nuclear Instruments. It focuses on detectors descriptions and data analysis methods.

== History ==
- Nuclear Instruments (1957–1958)
- Nuclear Instruments and Methods (1959–1981)
- Nuclear Instruments and Methods in Physics Research (1981–present)

- Nuclear Instruments and Methods in Physics Research Section A: Accelerators, Spectrometers, Detectors and Associated Equipment (1984–present)
- Nuclear Instruments and Methods in Physics Research Section B: Beam Interactions with Materials and Atoms (1984–present)
