= N. V. V. J. Swamy =

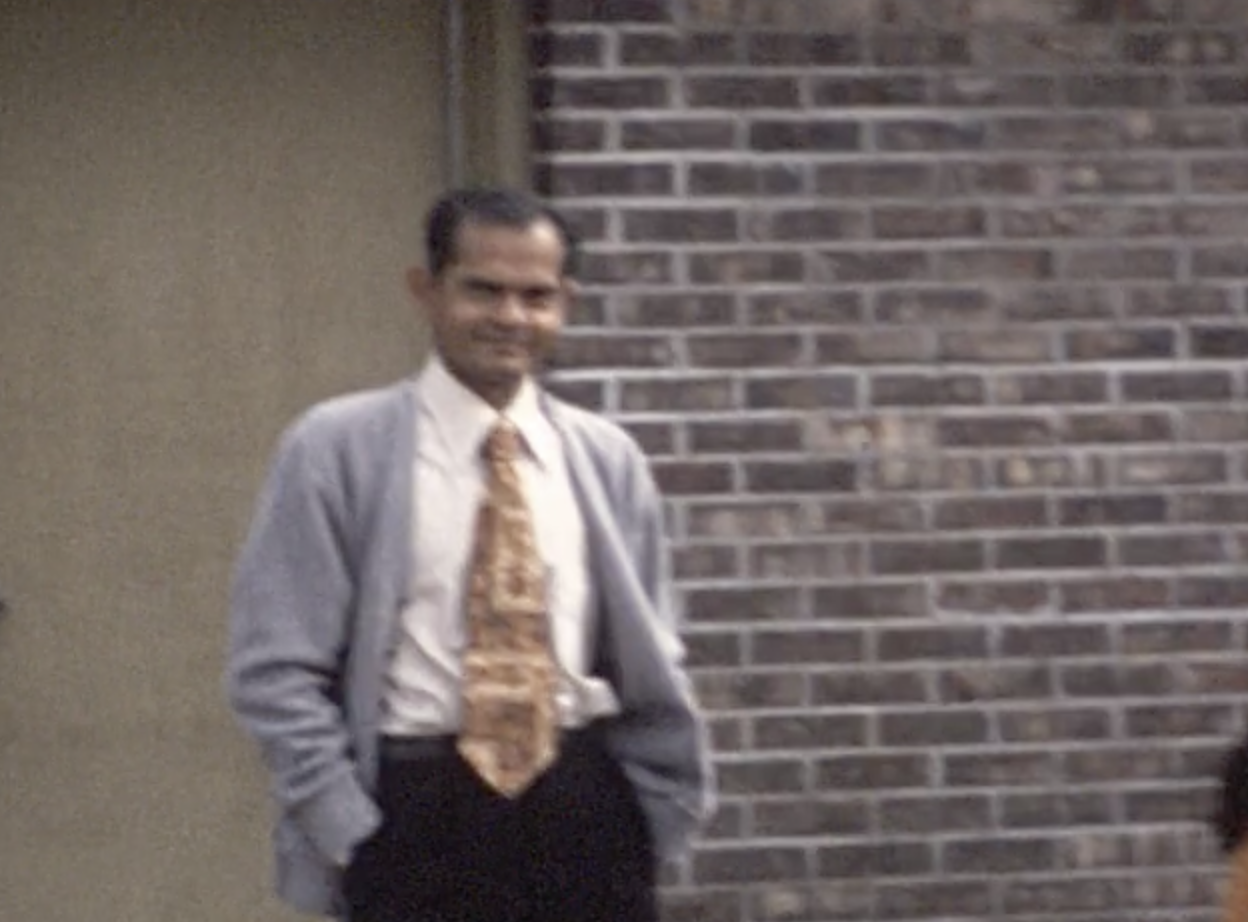
NVVJ Swamy (1975)

Nyayapathi Venkata Vaikuntha Jagannatha Swamy was a mathematical physicist. He is well known for his contributions to the physics of relativistic harmonic oscillator which found wide applications in Atomic, Nuclear and High Energy Physics. Some of the citations to Swamy's work on the relativistic oscillator are given in references. A review of the history and the generalized treatment of the relativistic harmonic oscillator is given by Lisboa et al.

He is also well known for his group theoretical contributions to mathematical physics. His widely used textbook co-authored with Mark A. Samuel, "Group Theory Made Easy for Scientists and Engineers" (Wiley-Interscience 1979), was very popular.

L.C. Bidenharn and Swamy published very influential papers on the relativistic Kepler problem. They introduced a symmetric Hamiltonian and solved the Dirac Equation for the Hydrogen atom. The history of this effort is given in Harold V. McIntosh's website.

== Early life and career ==
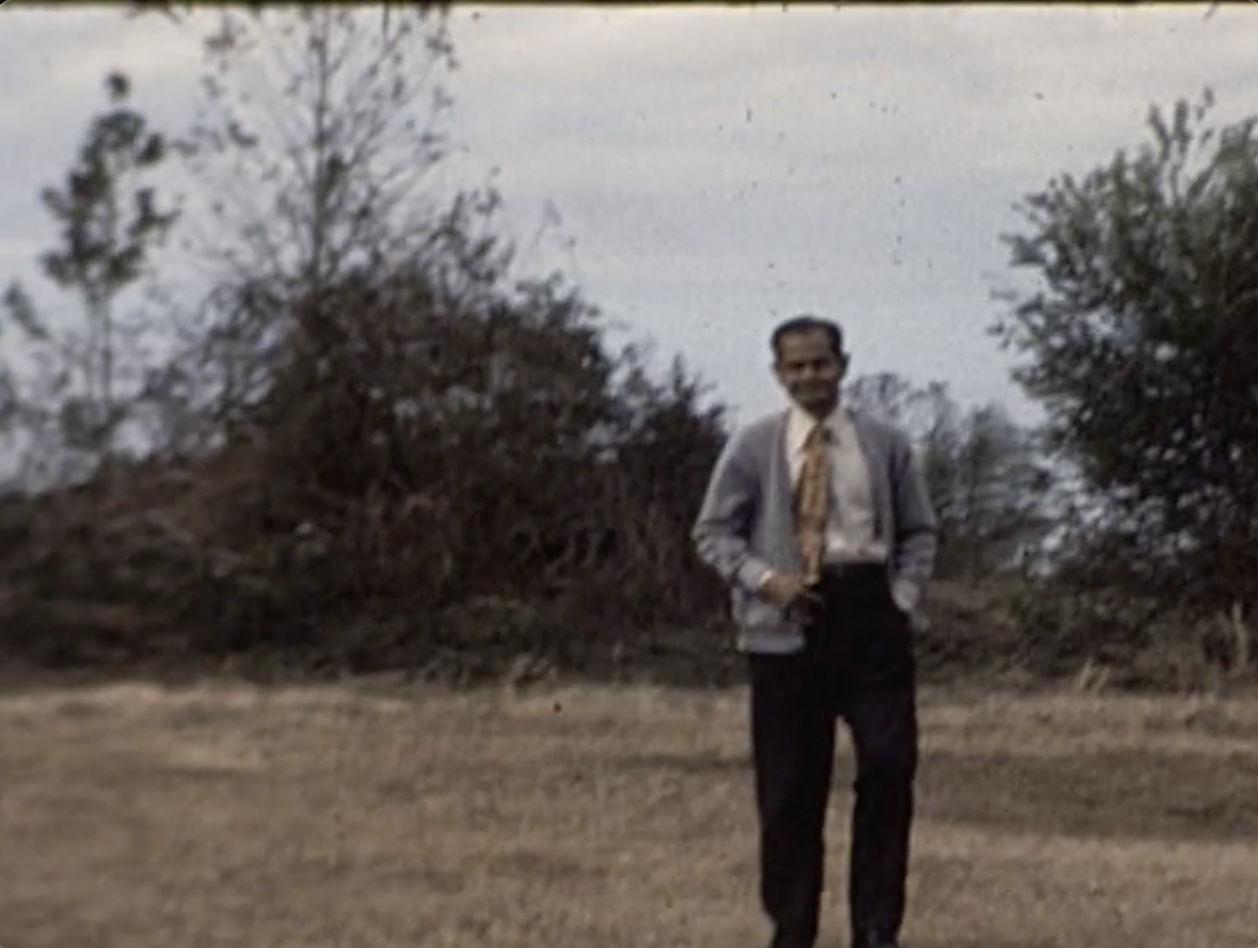
NVVJ Swamy (1975)

Swamy was born in Visakhapatnam, Andra Pradesh, on March 28, 1924.

Although he lost both his parents at the age of three, he managed to complete his studies in his hometown before pursuing three degrees, Bachelor's of Science in Mathematics, a Bachelor's of Science in Physics and a Master's of Science in Nuclear Physics, at Bombay University. Restricted funds meant he had to work as a civilian clerk with the Royal Indian Navy to pay for his education.

He arrived in the U.S. after receiving a scholarship from Florida State University, where, in 1958, he became one of the first three students to earn a doctorate in Theoretical Nuclear Physics under the notable physicist, Alex E.S. Green.

Nineteen years later, in 1977, he attained his American citizenship.

Although he served as a professor of physics at Oklahoma State University until 1987, he took sabbaticals and was a guest scientist in the German town of Julich and at Cambridge University in the UK. After retiring at the age of 62, he used his own funds to visit India and teach at various academic institutions.

Swamy died in his hometown of Visakhapatnam on 13 June 2013.

== Books ==
- Nyayapathi V.V.J. Swamy and Mark A. Samuel, Group Theory Made Easy for Scientists and Engineers, Wiley-Interscience, 1979, ISBN 0-471-05128-4
