= N = 2 superstring =

In string theory, N = 2 superstring is a theory in which the worldsheet admits N = 2 supersymmetry rather than N = 1 supersymmetry as in the usual superstring. The target space (a term used for a generalization of space-time) is four-dimensional, but either none or two of its dimensions are time-like, i.e. it has either 4+0 or 2+2 dimensions. The spectrum consists of only one massless scalar, which describes gravitational fluctuations of self-dual gravity. The target space theory is therefore self-dual gravity, and is thought to consist no local (or propagating) degrees of freedom.
