= Nd:YCOB =

Nd-doped YCOB (Nd:YCa_{4}O(BO_{3})_{3}) is a nonlinear optical crystal, which is commonly used as an active laser medium. It can be grown from a melt by the Czochralski technique. It belongs to the monoclinic system with space group C_{s}^{2}-Cm. Each neodymium ion replaces a yttrium ion in the YCOB crystal structure.

== Parameters in the Sellmeier equation ==
	n_{x}	n_{y}	n_{z}
A	2.78232	2.88739	2.92685
B	0.01120	0.01223	0.01474
C	0.08990	0.08855	0.07466
D	7.2561×10^{−5}	6.1142×10^{−5}	5.2148×10^{−5}
