= Nuclear Physics News =

Academic journal published by Taylor & Francis

Nuclear Physics News, International (ISSN 1050-6896) is a quarterly science magazine covering research in nuclear physics, published since 1990 by Taylor & Francis. It is the official magazine of the Nuclear Physics European Collaboration Committee, an Expert Committee of the European Science Foundation, which was also established in 1990. The magazine is based in Garching bei München, Germany.

The editor in chief is Gabriele-Elisabeth Körner (Technical University of Munich).
