= Free-fall time =

Concept in astrophysics

The free-fall time is the characteristic time that would take a body to collapse under its own gravitational attraction, if no other forces existed to oppose the collapse. As such, it plays a fundamental role in setting the timescale for a wide variety of astrophysical processes—from star formation to helio-seismology to supernovae—in which gravity plays a dominant role.

== Derivation ==
=== Infall to a point source of gravity ===
It is relatively simple to derive the free-fall time by applying Kepler's Third Law of planetary motion to a degenerate elliptic orbit. Consider a point mass $m$ at distance $R$ from a point source of mass $M$ which falls radially inward to it. (Crucially, Kepler's Third Law depends only on the semi-major axis of the orbit, and does not depend on the eccentricity). A purely radial trajectory is an example of a degenerate ellipse with an eccentricity of 1 and semi-major axis $R/2.$ Therefore, the time it would take a body to fall inward, turn around, and return to its original position is the same as the period of a circular orbit of radius $R/2,$ by Kepler's Third Law:
$$t_{\text{orbit}}=\frac{2\pi}{\sqrt{G(M+m)}}\left(\tfrac{R}{2}\right)^{3/2}=\frac{\pi R^{3/2}}{\sqrt{2G(M+m)}}.$$

To see that the semi-major axis is $R/2,$ we must examine properties of orbits as they become increasingly elliptical. Kepler's First Law states that an orbit is an ellipse with the center of mass as one focus. In the case of a very small mass falling toward a very large mass $M,$ the center of mass is within the larger mass. The focus of an ellipse is increasingly off-center with increasing ellipticity. In the limiting case of a degenerate ellipse with an eccentricity of 1, the largest diameter of the orbit extends from the initial position of the infalling object $R$ to the point source of mass $M.$ In other words, the ellipse becomes a line of length $R.$ The semi-major axis is half the width of the ellipse along the long axis, which in the degenerate case becomes $R/2.$

If the free-falling body completed a full orbit, it would begin at distance $R$ from the point source mass $M$, fall inward until it reached that point source, then return to its original position. In real systems, the point source mass isn't truly a point source and the infalling body eventually collides with some surface. Thus, it only completes half the orbit. But the orbit is symmetrical so the free-fall time is half the period.
$$t_{\text{ff}}=t_{\text{orbit}}/2=\pi\frac{(R/2)^{3/2}}{\sqrt{G(M+m)}}=\pi R/2[\tfrac{R/2}{G(M+m)}]^{1/2}$$
(This formula also follows from the formula for the falling time as a function of position.)

For example, the time for an object in the orbit of the Earth around the Sun with period $P=1$ year, to fall into the Sun if it were suddenly stopped in orbit, would be:
$$\tfrac{1}{2}\frac{P}{2^{3/2}}=\tfrac{1}{\sqrt{2}}\frac{P}{4}.$$
This amounts to 64.6 days.

=== Infall of a spherically-symmetric distribution of mass ===
Now, consider a case where the mass $M$ is not a point mass, but is distributed in a spherically-symmetric distribution about the center, with an average mass density of $\rho$,
$$\rho=\frac{3M}{4\pi R^3},$$
where the volume of a sphere is: $\frac43\pi R^3.$

Let us assume that the only force acting is gravity. Then, as first demonstrated by Newton, and can easily be demonstrated using the divergence theorem, the acceleration of gravity at any given distance $R$ from the center of the sphere depends only upon the total mass contained within $R.$ The consequence of this result is that if one imagined breaking the sphere up into a series of concentric shells, each shell would collapse only subsequent to the shells interior to it, and no shells cross during collapse. As a result, the free-fall time of a test particle at $R$ can be expressed solely in terms of the total mass $M$ interior to it. In terms of the average density interior to $R,$ the free-fall time is:
$$t_{\text{ff}}=\tfrac14\sqrt{\tfrac{3\pi}{2G\rho}}\simeq 0.5427\tfrac{1}{\sqrt{G\rho}}\simeq 66430\frac{1}{\sqrt{\rho}}$$
where the latter is in SI units.

This result is exactly the same as from the previous section when $M\gg m.$

== Applications ==
The free-fall time is a very useful estimate of the relevant timescale for a number of astrophysical processes. To get a sense of its application, we may write:
$$t_{\text{ff}}\simeq\frac{35\,\mbox{min}}{\sqrt{\rho\ (\mbox{g}\cdot\mbox{cm}^{-3})}}$$
Here we have estimated the numerical value for the free-fall time as roughly 35 minutes for a celestial body of mean density 1 g/cm^{3}.

=== Comparison ===
For an object falling from infinity in a capture orbit, the time it takes from a given position to fall to the central point mass is the same as the free-fall time, except for a constant $\tfrac{4}{3\pi}\approx0.424\,.$
