= Nuclear timescale =

Estimate of the lifetime of a star

In astrophysics, the nuclear timescale is an approximate measure of how long nuclear reactions can sustain a star's luminosity, defined by the amount of available nuclear fuel and the rate at which it is consumed. Under typical main‑sequence conditions, the nuclear timescale is much longer than both the thermal and dynamical (free-fall) timescales because nuclear fusion of light elements such as hydrogen provides the dominant source of energy over most of a star's life. In some specialized cases, such as models of massive zero‑metallicity stars, energy production and mixing can alter evolutionary predictions.

== Stellar astrophysics ==
Hydrogen generally determines a star's nuclear lifetime because it is used as the main source of fuel in a main sequence star. Hydrogen becomes helium in the nuclear reaction that takes place within stars; when the hydrogen has been exhausted, the star moves on to another phase of its life and begins burning the helium.

$$\tau_{nuc} = \frac{\text{total mass of fuel available}}{\text{rate of fuel consumption}} \times \text{fraction of star over which fuel is burned} = \frac{MX}{\frac{L}{Q}} \times F$$

where M is the mass of the star, X is the fraction of the star (by mass) that is composed of the fuel, L is the star's luminosity, Q is the energy released per mass of the fuel from nuclear fusion (the chemical equation should be examined to get this value), and F is the fraction of the star where the fuel is burned (F is generally equal to .1 or so). As an example, the Sun's nuclear time scale is approximately 10 billion years.
