= Nuts and bolts (general relativity) =

Spacetime classification scheme in general relativity

In physics, in the theory of general relativity, spacetimes with at least a 1-parameter group of isometries can be classified according to the fixed point-sets of the action. Isolated fixed points are called nuts. The other possibility is that the fixed point set is a metric 2-sphere, called bolt. The number of nuts and bolts can also be related to topological invariants, such as the Euler characteristic. This classification is widely used in the analysis of gravitational instantons.
