= Nuclear Physics (journal) =

- Discipline: Nuclear physics
- Language: English

Publication details
- History: 1956–present
- Publisher: Elsevier
- Impact factor: 1.683 (Nucl. Phys. A); 2.759 (Nucl. Phys. B) (2020)

Standard abbreviations
- ISO 4: Nucl. Phys.

Indexing
- Nucl. Phys. A
- CODEN: NUPABL
- ISSN: 0375-9474
- Nucl. Phys. B
- CODEN: NUPBBO
- ISSN: 0550-3213
- Nucl. Phys. B Proc. Suppl.
- CODEN: NPBSE7
- ISSN: 0920-5632

Nuclear Physics A, Nuclear Physics B, Nuclear Physics B: Proceedings Supplements and discontinued Nuclear Physics are peer-reviewed scientific journals published by Elsevier. The scope of Nuclear Physics A is nuclear and hadronic physics, and that of Nuclear Physics B is high energy physics, quantum field theory, statistical systems, and mathematical physics.

Nuclear Physics was established in 1956, and then split into Nuclear Physics A and Nuclear Physics B in 1967. A supplement series to Nuclear Physics B, called Nuclear Physics B: Proceedings Supplements has been published from 1987 onwards until 2015 and continues as Nuclear and Particle Physics Proceedings.

Nuclear Physics B is part of the SCOAP^{3} initiative.

== Abstracting and indexing ==
=== Nuclear Physics A ===
- Current Contents/Physics, Chemical, & Earth Sciences

=== Nuclear Physics B ===
- Current Contents/Physics, Chemical, & Earth Sciences
