= Dry glue =

Dry glue is an adhesion product based upon the adaptations of geckos' feet that allow them to climb sheer surfaces such as vertical glass. Synthetic equivalents use carbon nanotubes as synthetic setae on reusable adhesive patches.

== Background ==
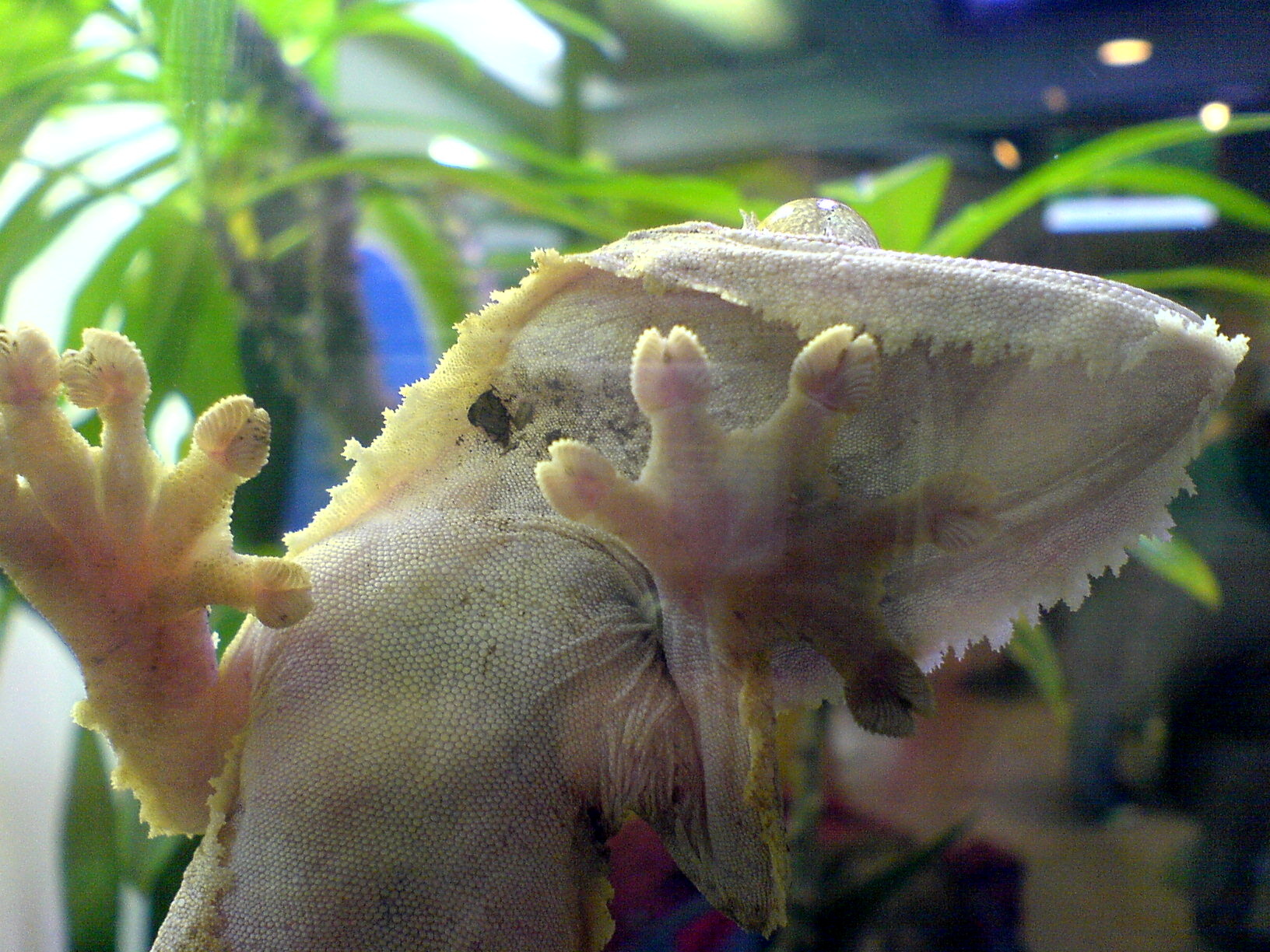
Gecko climbing glass using its natural seta

A gecko can hang on a glass surface using only one toe. This ability is attributed to van der Waals force, although a more recent study suggests that water molecules of roughly monolayer thickness (present on virtually all natural surfaces) also play a role.

== Developments ==
In 2007, researchers from the University of Akron and Rensselaer Polytechnic Institute announced they had developed a form of flexible, reusable gecko tape using carbon nanotubes to create microscopic synthetic setae and spatulae capable of supporting a shear stress of 32 N/cm^{2}, which is four times the strength of a gecko's foot.

In 2008 researchers from the University of Dayton reported a gecko glue capable of supporting 100N/cm^{2}, ten times the strength generated by a gecko's foot. The research also used carbon nanotubes, but included a curled end which allowed stronger binding but easy removal. Defense Advanced Research Projects Agency (DARPA) has a project called "Z-Man" that is attempting to develop a fabric allowing soldiers to scale vertical walls while carrying a full combat load. In February 2012 Nitto Denko developed a version of gecko tape capable of sticking at temperatures between -150 and 500°C.

== See also ==
- Gecko adhesion
- Gecko tape
- Synthetic setae
