= Arthropod adhesion =

Locomotive ability evolved in arthropods

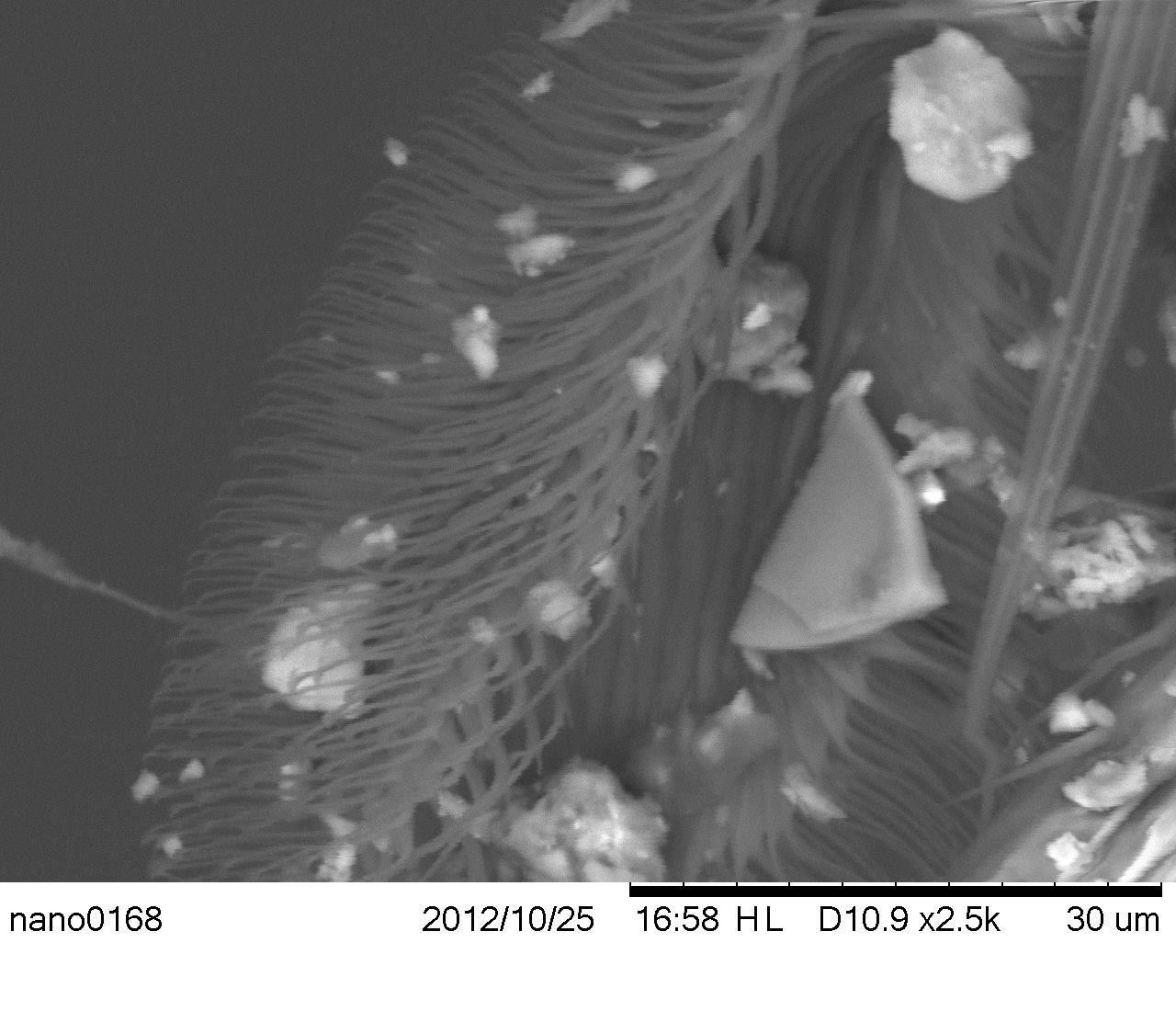
Electron micrograph of housefly pulvilli, the finely hairy pads on their feet that enable them to stick to walls and ceilings

Arthropods, including insects and spiders, make use of smooth adhesive pads as well as hairy pads for climbing and locomotion along non-horizontal surfaces. Both types of pads in insects make use of liquid secretions and are considered 'wet'. Dry adhesive mechanisms primarily rely on Van der Waals' forces and are also used by organisms other than insects. The fluid provides capillary and viscous adhesion and appears to be present in all insect adhesive pads. Little is known about the chemical properties of the adhesive fluids and the ultrastructure of the fluid-producing cells is currently not extensively studied. Additionally, both hairy and smooth types of adhesion have evolved separately numerous times in insects. Few comparative studies between the two types of adhesion mechanisms have been done, and there is a lack of information regarding the forces that can be supported by these systems in insects. Additionally, tree frogs and some mammals such as the arboreal possum and bats also make use of smooth adhesive pads. The use of adhesive pads for locomotion across non-horizontal surfaces is a trait that evolved separately in different species, making it an example of convergent evolution. The power of adhesion allows these organisms to be able to climb on almost any substance.

The exact mechanisms of arthropod adhesion are still unknown for some species, but this topic is of great importance to biologists, physicists, and engineers. These highly specialized structures are not restricted to one particular area of the leg. They may be located on different parts, such as claws, derivatives of the pretarsus, tarsal apex, tarsomeres or tibia. From the scaling analysis, it has been suggested that animal lineages relying on the dry adhesion, such as lizards and spiders, have a higher density of terminal contact elements compared to systems that use wet adhesive mechanisms, such as insects. Since these effects are based on fundamental physical principles and highly related to the shape of the structure, they are also the same for artificial surfaces with similar geometry. Adhesion and friction forces per-unit-pad area were very similar in smooth and hairy systems when tested. Strong adhesion may be beneficial in many situations, but it also can create difficulties in locomotion. Direction-dependence is an important and fundamental property of adhesive structures that are able to rapidly and controllably adhere during locomotion. Researchers are unsure whether direction-dependence is achieved through changes in contact area or through a change in shear stress. Friction and adhesion forces in most animal attachment organs are higher when they are pulled towards the body than when they push away from it. This has been observed in geckos and spiders but also in the smooth adhesive pads of ants, bush-crickets and cockroaches. Adhesive hairs of geckos are non-symmetrical and feature distally pointing setae and spatulae that are able to generate increased friction and adhesion when aligned with a proximal pull. The adhesive hairs of some beetles behave similarly to those of geckos. While directional-dependence is present in other animals, it has yet to be confirmed in insects with hairy adhesive pads.

It has been observed that a surface micro-roughness asperity size of less than five micrometres can strongly reduce insect attachment and climbing ability, and this adhesion reducing effect has been put to use in a variety of plant species that create wax crystals.

Adhesive chemical secretions are also used for predation defence, mating, holding substrates, anchor eggs, building retreats, prey capture, and self-grooming.

== Smooth adhesive pads for locomotion ==
Smooth adhesion has evolved in many families of organisms independently, which creates structures that appear unrelated to each other but generate the same function. Phylogenetic analyses indicate that adhesive structures of arthropods evolved several times. Organisms such as ants, bees, cockroaches and grasshoppers use smooth adhesive pads. There are different types of smooth adhesive pads in these organisms such as the arolia, pulvilli, and euplantulae, all of which have a cuticle that is extremely soft and deformable. The arolia of some ant species has been observed to be fluid-filled and is extended and contracted to provide adhesive force. The euplantulae in crickets have a hexagonal microstructure which is similar to toe pads in tree frogs. Generally, insects are able to adhere to surfaces through the contact between the insect adhesive organs and substrates that are mediated by nanometre-thin films of adhesive fluid. Some functional principles of smooth pads (adaptability, viscoelasticity, pressure sensitivity) are similar to those known from industrial pressure-sensitive adhesion. Smooth adhesive organs are pillowlike, which refers to the soft and fluid-filled, cuticular sac that moulds to the surface increasing the contact area on rough surfaces. It appears that the fluid in smooth adhesive systems mainly serves to maximize contact on rough substrates. The internal fibrous structure of smooth pads might be vital to their ability to deform, for shear-induced lateral increase in contact area, or for efficient transfer of tensile forces, yet at this point its specific function is unknown.

== Hairy adhesive pads for locomotion ==
Both hairy and smooth pads in arthropods act to maximize the amount of contact with a surface. The foot pads of flies are densely covered with flexible hair-like structures called setae, and some lizards and spiders use similar hairy pads to create adhesive effects. This indicates a favourable design for hairy pad adhesion. Hairy pads can be classified as pulvillus, fossula spongiosa, and tenent hairs. Hairy attachment pads employed few other features, such as flaw tolerance, lower sensitivity to contamination, and roughness. Hairy attachment systems are typical for evolutionary younger and successful insect groups, such as Coleoptera and Diptera. The density of hairs increases with increasing body weight. An increase of the attachment strength in hairy systems is realized by increasing the number of single contact points. Protuberances on the hairy pads of Coleoptera, Dermaptera, and Diptera belong to different types. Representatives of the first two lineages have socketed setae on their pads. Setae can range in length from a few micrometers to several millimeters. Dipteran outgrowths are acanthae, which are single sclerotized protuberances originating from a single cell. The acanthae are hollow inside, and some have pores under the terminal plate, which presumably deliver an adhesive secretion directly to the contact area. Hairy attachment pads of reduviid bugs, flies and beetles secrete fluid into the contact area. The secretion contains non-volatile, lipid-like substances, but in some species it is two-phasic emulsion presumably containing water-soluble and lipid-soluble fractions. Adhesion strongly decreases as the volume of the secretion decreases, which indicates that a layer of pad secretion that covers the terminal plates is crucial for generating a strong attractive force. Data suggests that besides van der Waals and Coulomb forces flies rely on attractive capillary forces mediated by the pad secretion. At low humidity, adhesion strongly depends on the amount of liquid deposited on the surface, and therefore contact duration.

The hairy pad design has been argued to have a number of advantages over the smooth design, such as superior performance on rough substrates, effortless detachment, self-cleaning properties, and increased adhesion due to contact splitting.

Unlike frog and lizard adhesive pads which are often dry, insects tend to have an associated fluid for adhesion. The fluid that is secreted has a special property of being composed of an immiscible mixture of hydrophilic and hydrophobic material.

Adhesive foot pads only stick when pulled toward the body, but unstick when moved away from it, which allows for effortless and rapid detachment. Insects can do this actively through their claw flexor muscle, but in most cases, the foot is able to attach and detach passively, without the help of any nerves and muscles. (Bullock, Drechsler, & Federle, 2008)

== Other uses for adhesives in insects ==
Adhesive chemical secretions are also used for predation defence, mating, holding substrates, anchoring eggs, building retreats, prey capture, and self grooming. Structures for use in repelling attackers or temporarily or permanently adhering to a substratum or a mating partner have been found in the developmental stages of the egg, larvae, pupae, and adult. Some species have developed adhesives for prey capture and some use adhesive glue for cocoon building. Adhesive glands of the head can involve mouthparts, antennae, the labial salivary glands, or species specific glands. A variety of glands, often located in the abdomen, can be used for defensive adhesion mechanisms.

== Insect adhesive glands ==
Epidermal glands and their secretions are highly diverse and vary in their function for: protection from adverse environmental conditions and microbial contamination, regulation of water balance, communication with pheromones and alelochemicals, defense from predators and parasites, construction and making food accessible.

Class 1 epidermal cells are the predominant glandular cell type for adhesive gland systems in insects with features that indicate either lipid or protein secretion. In class 1 cells for locomotion lipoidal secretion is most common, although the secretions are often mixtures of lipids with proteins and carbohydrates. Class 1 cells that are used for more permanent body or egg anchorage and for retreat building make use of protein-based secretions.

Class 2 epidermal adhesive gland cells have only been found in the defence systems of Aphidoidea and Tingidae. Defensive adhesive secretions function mechanically and also develop a chemical irritant function caused by reactive substances of low molecular weight which combines within the sticky secretion to produce toxic glue.

Class 3 epidermal adhesive glands are usually bicellular and consist of a terminal secretarily active cell and an adjacent canal cell that surrounds the cuticular conducting duct.

Hundreds of gland cells and glandular units are contained in class 1 or 3 and might aggregate to form whole gland organs so as to discharge large amounts of a secretion. Adhesive cells used for locomotion are all class 1 epidermal adhesive cells. Class 3 epidermal adhesive cells may play a role in some hairy adhesive pads, but this has not yet been confirmed. Some adhesive glands that are used for locomotion are also used for capturing or holding on to prey (Fac, 2010). The secretion of some class 1 cells and class 3 cells are mixed in the subcuticular or intracuticular spaces. They may also be mixed in the larger glandular reservoirs before being discharged, which allows the formation of complex structural mixtures as well as chemical reactions between the components of the mixture. Gland cells used by female insects for gluing eggs to a substratum during oviposition have not been well studied. Glands used for sticking eggs to surfaces have been observed to be of the class 1 type. Adhesive glands are involved in the production of silks, which are produced by a variety of dermal glands for building shelters, cocoons, and supporting sperm. Class 1 cells are often applied for this purpose.

== Adhesive secretions ==
Most bioadhesives use polymers (carbohydrates and proteins) to create the adhesive and cohesive strength. Natural adhesives used by both plants and animals are composed of only a few basic components, such as proteins, polysaccharides, polyphenols, and lipids that are mixed in various combinations. Natural adhesive chemical and micromechanical functions are often not well understood. Adhesives that are for mechanical work are often composed of high-molecular compounds containing proteins, resins, mixtures of long-chain hydrocarbons and mucopolysaccharides, or waxes. Defensive adhesive secretions often combine their mechanical effect with a low molecular weight chemical irritant to deter predators.

There is a great diversity of aliphatic compounds in insect adhesive secretions. Aliphatic compounds are a major constituent of secretions for some locomotion organs in insects, and they are also involved in the formation of defence secretions. Adhesives of this type contain only limited amounts or no polar components such as fatty acids, esters, and alcohols. Often these compounds are temperature sensitive. Very little research has been done on classifying and identifying carbohydrates within insect adhesive secretions. So far, glucose, trehalose and mucopolysaccharides that contain glucose, galactose, mannose, beta-glucopyranose, and/or (N-acetyl-beta-) glucosamine have been identified as components of insect adhesives. Carbohydrates have been found in defense secretions as well as for sticking eggs together. Aromatic compounds have been identified in the adhesive defence secretion of termites and ants. It is also thought to be used by butterflies to secure eggs. Insect adhesives contain a broad spectrum of isoprenoids. These compounds have been found in defense mechanisms in some species such as termites. Amino acids, peptides, and proteins are nearly always found in insects' adhesive secretions. They are employed for adhesion across many functions such as defense, locomotion and cocoon building.

== Arachnid adhesion ==
Spiders have independently evolved hairy adhesive pads. Their pads do not use an associated fluid and are much similar to many lizards, not like the hairy pads that are used by insects.

== Convergence with tetrapods ==
Smooth adhesive pads are an example of convergent evolution between amphibians (geckos and frogs), arthropods, and mammals (possum). The mechanisms involved even appear to be similar. This could indicate that this method of locomotion has found its optimal form in many species of animals. Hairy attachment systems of the gekkonid lizards and spiders do not produce fluids; these organisms rely on van der Waals interactions for the generation of strong attractive forces. Tree frog toe-pads are made of columnar epithelial cells that are separated from each other at the apices. Pores for mucous glands open into the channels that are between the cells which create a toe pad epithelium that has an array of flat topped cells with mucus-filled grooves between them. The purpose of having cells separated at the tip is to allow the toe to conform to the structure it will adhere to. The hexagonal design around the outside of the cells (similar to the crickets) is likely to allow for the mucus to spread evenly over the cell. Smooth adhesive pads are found in arboreal possums, which are marsupials that glide between trees. The possum is also capable of using smooth adhesive pads to climb vertically, making use of large toe pads. The pads consist of an epidermal layer of stratified squamous epithelium, with the outer most layer's cells being flattened. The pad has alternating ridges and grooves with sweat glands emptying into the grooves providing fluid for wet adhesion. Bats have also evolved adhesive pads separately. Some bats make use of an adhesive appendage, while others have suctioning adhesive organs.

== Importance to humans ==
Some researchers propose using the advanced locomotive mechanisms seen in arthropods for modelling robotic movement to create maximally efficient movement. Currently insect adhesive pads still outperform most artificial adhesives with respect to rapid controllability. Some researchers also suggest using arthropod-based adhesive mechanisms for more effective tape and binding tools. Additionally, some research indicates that the wrinkling effect that occurs in human fingers when submerged in water acts to increase grip on wet objects. The mechanism is unknown but it may be due to changes in adhesion properties of the finger pads. By examining the properties of bioadhesion, finger pad adhesion can be better understood. However, this study on increased finger pad dexterity from wrinkling has been heavily disputed. Despite this, it can be argued that a better understanding of insect adhesion mechanisms can help guide the development of better adhesives for human mobility and technology, as well as inform a better understanding of human finger function.

== See also ==
- Gecko feet
- Synthetic setae
