= Sangbae Kim =

South Korean roboticist

Sangbae Kim is a South Korean robotics engineer known for developing several bio-inspired robots, including the MIT Cheetah robots, Stickybot, Spinybot, and iSprawl. He has contributed to innovative bio-inspired robot development in academia for decades and is now expanding his work into industry.

== Career ==
Sangbae Kim is a professor of Mechanical Engineering at MIT. He has been leading the Biomimetic Robotics Laboratory for 16 years (2009–2025), but is currently on leave to work as a Robotics Architect at Meta, where he is involved in its humanoid robotics efforts, including the development of the project known as “Metabot.”

== Education ==
Sangbae Kim studied at Yonsei University in South Korea from 1994 to 2001. He majored in Mechanical Engineering for his bachelor's degree. After that, he came to the United States for graduate school and did a Master's in Mechanical Engineering at Stanford University from 2002 to 2004. Then, in the same school and department, he did his Doctorate from 2004 to 2008. Under the supervision of his academic advisor, Mark Cutkosky, he wrote the thesis “Bio-inspired robot design with compliant underactuated system,” which was about a gecko-inspired robot that could climb up walls using hairs on its feet. After graduating, he worked at a Microrobotics lab at Harvard University from 2008 to 2009 as a post-doctoral fellow. There, he helped develop a Meshworm, which was a robot moving like an earthworm.

== Research ==
Sangbae Kim's early research during his graduate studies at Stanford was focused on developing robots inspired by small animals such as insects and lizards. One example is iSprawl, a six-legged robot with a compliant structure that realized fast speed with a minimal number of actuators, inspired by the locomotion mechanisms of insects. Other examples include Spinybot and Stickybot, which both implemented biological adhesion mechanisms into robotics. Spinybot is known for applying a micro-spine structure to increase the contact area so that the robot could attach to rough surfaces like rocks. Stickybot used directional polymer adhesives that mimic gecko setae, which enabled the robot to climb up vertical surfaces.

After becoming a professor at MIT, Sangbae Kim began focusing on the development of the MIT Cheetah series, inspired by the leg movement mechanisms of mammals. The Cheetah series uses high-torque, modular electric motors that enable high-speed motion and precise power control while maintaining relatively lightweight designs. These robots are capable of dynamic movements such as running at high speeds, jumping over obstacles, and performing backflips, as well as adapting to flexible configurations. Their design emphasizes speed, agility, and stability in locomotion.

== Awards and honors ==
- 2019, Defense Science Study Group
- 2016, Best paper award, IEEE/ASME Transactions on Mechatronics: Design Principles for Energy-Efficient Legged Locomotion and Implementation on the MIT Cheetah Robot
- 2015, Ruth and Joel Spira Award for Distinguished Teaching, SoE, MIT
- 2014, Faculty Early Career Development (CAREER) Award
- 2013, Young Faculty Award (YFA), Defense Advanced Research Projects Agency: A Disaster Response Robot Capable of Power Manipulation
- 2010, Esther and Harold E. Edgerton Career Development Chair
- 2009, King-Sun Fu Memorial Best Transactions on Robotics Paper Award (first Author): "Smooth Vertical Surface Climbing with Directional Adhesion"
- 2007, Best Student Paper Award and Best conference paper finalist IEEE International Conference in Robotics and Automation 2007 (first author): Whole Body Adhesion: Hierarchical, Directional and Distributed Control of Adhesive Forces for a Climbing Robot
- 2006, Best video award, IEEE International Conference in Robotics and Automation 2006 (second author): Climbing Walls with Microspines
- 2006, TIME Magazine's Best Inventions of 2006: Leapin' Lizards
