= Nano tape =

Synthetic adhesive tape

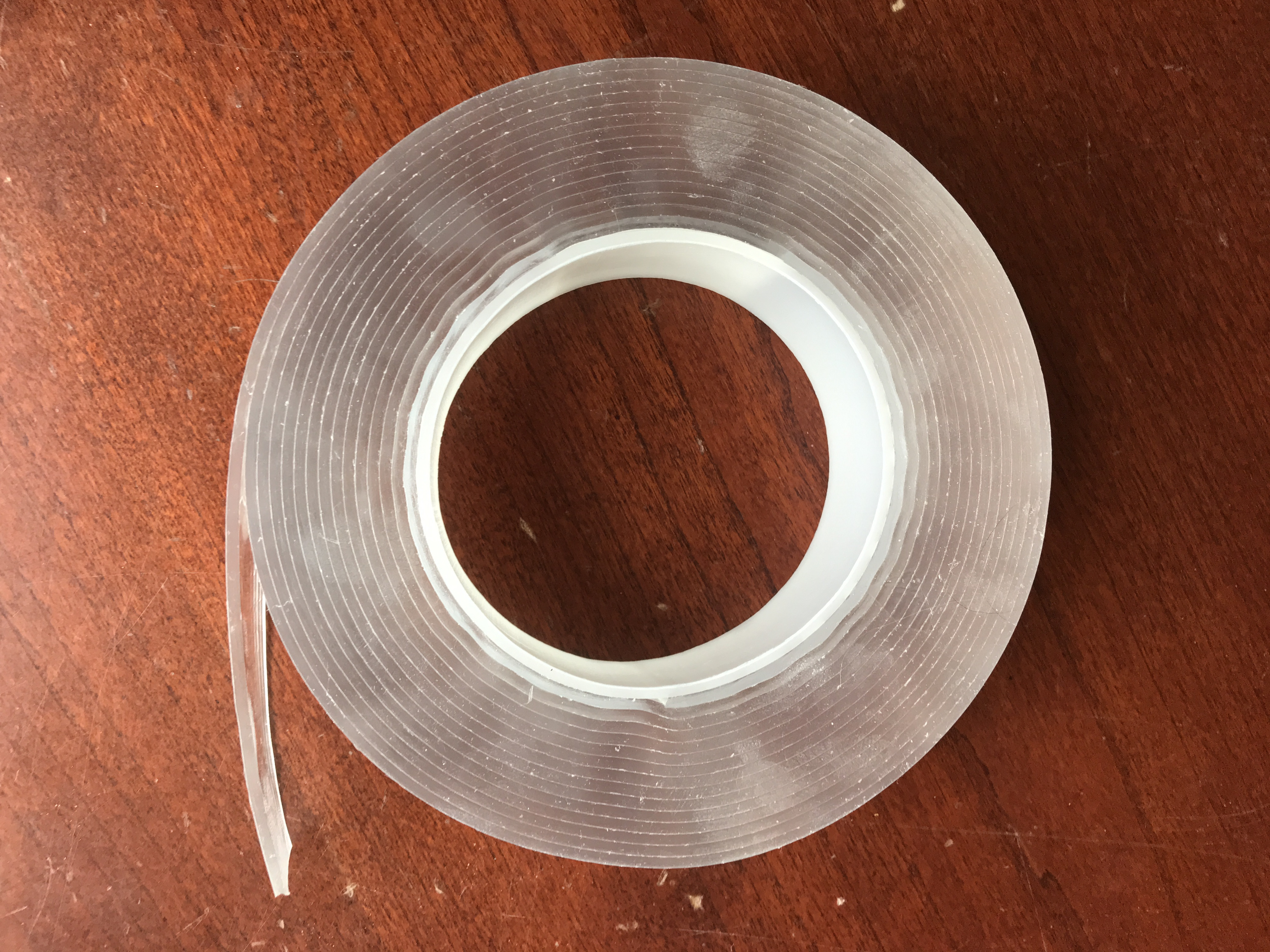
Commercially available nano tape.

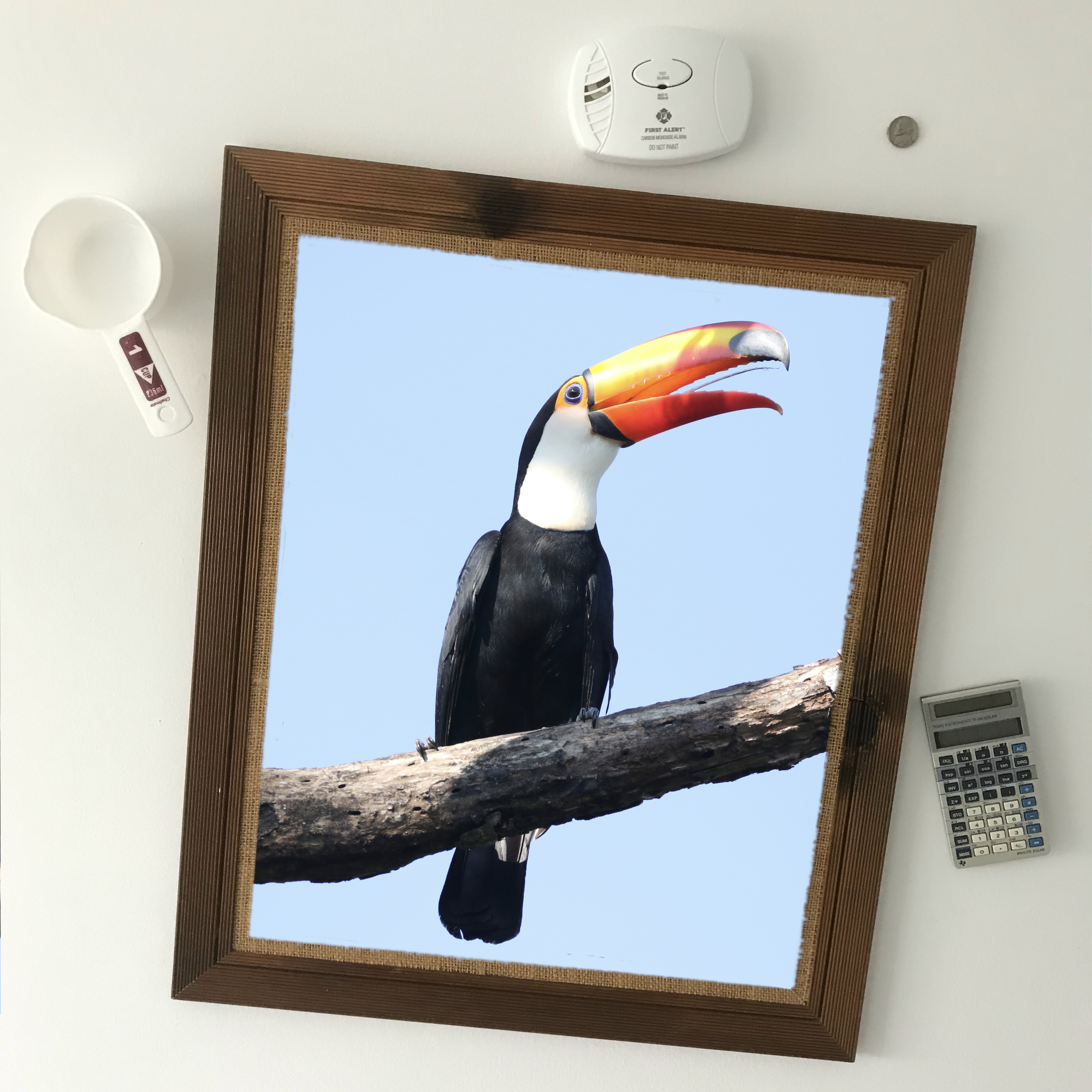
Nano tape used to hang household items.

Nano tape, also called gecko tape (or commercially as Insanity Tape or Alien Tape) is a synthetic adhesive tape consisting of arrays of carbon nanotubes transferred onto a backing material of flexible polymer tape. These arrays are called synthetic setae and mimic the nanostructures found on the toes of a gecko; this is an example of biomimicry. The adhesion is achieved not with chemical adhesives, but via van der Waals forces, which are weak electric forces generated between two atoms or molecules that are very close to each other.

== Explanation ==
Geckos show a remarkable ability to climb smooth vertical surfaces at high speeds, exhibiting both strong attachment and easy rapid removal, or shear adhesion, of their feet.

On a gecko's foot, micrometer-sized elastic hairs called setae are split into nanometer-sized structures called spatulas. The shear adhesion is achieved by forming and breaking van der Waals forces between these microscopic structures and the substrate.

Nano tapes mimic these structures with carbon nanotube bundles, which simulate setae and individual nanotubes, which simulate spatulas, to achieve macroscopic shear adhesion and to translate the weak van der Waals interactions into high shear forces. The shear adhesion allows the tape to be easily peeled off in the manner a gecko lifts its foot. Since the carbon nanotube arrays leave no residue on the substrate, the tape can be reused many times.

== History ==
Nano tape is one of the first developments of synthetic setae, which arose from a collaboration between the Manchester Centre for Mesoscience and Nanotechnology, and the Institute for Microelectronics Technology in Russia. Work started in 2001 and two years later results were published in Nature Materials.

The group prepared flexible fibers of polyimide as the synthetic setae structures on the surface of a 5 μm thick film of the same material using electron beam lithography and dry etching in an oxygen plasma. The fibres were 2 μm long, with a diameter of around 500 nm and a periodicity of 1.6 μm, and covered an area of roughly 1 cm^{2} (0.16 sq in) (see figure on the left). Initially, the team used a silicon wafer as a substrate, but found that the tape's adhesive power increased by almost 1,000 times if they used a soft bonding substrate such as Scotch tape. This is because the flexible substrate yields a much higher ratio of the number of setae in contact with the surface over the total number of setae.

The result of this "gecko tape" was tested by attaching a sample to the hand of a 15 cm (5.9 in) high plastic Spider-Man figure weighing 40 g (1.4 oz), which enabled it to stick to a glass ceiling. The tape, which had a contact area of around 0.5 square centimetres (0.078 sq in) with the glass, was able to carry a load of more than 100 g (3.5 oz). However, the adhesion coefficient was only 0.06, which is low compared with real geckos (8 to 16).

== Commercial use ==
Commercial nano tape is usually sold as double-sided tape that is useful for hanging lightweight items, such as pictures and decorative items on smooth walls. Using superaligned carbon nanotubes, some nano tapes can stay sticky in extreme temperatures.

== Gallery ==
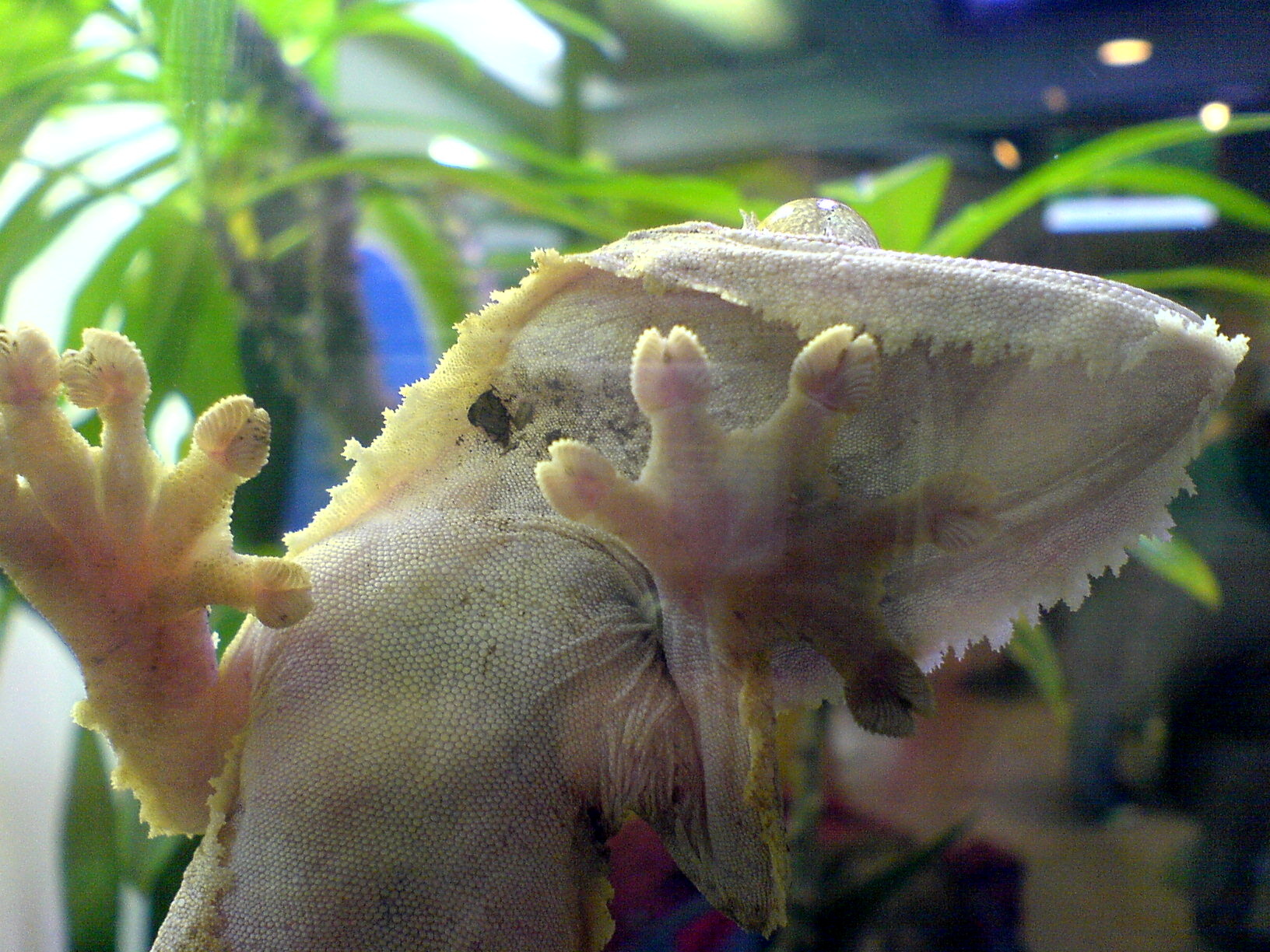
Gecko climbing a glass surface

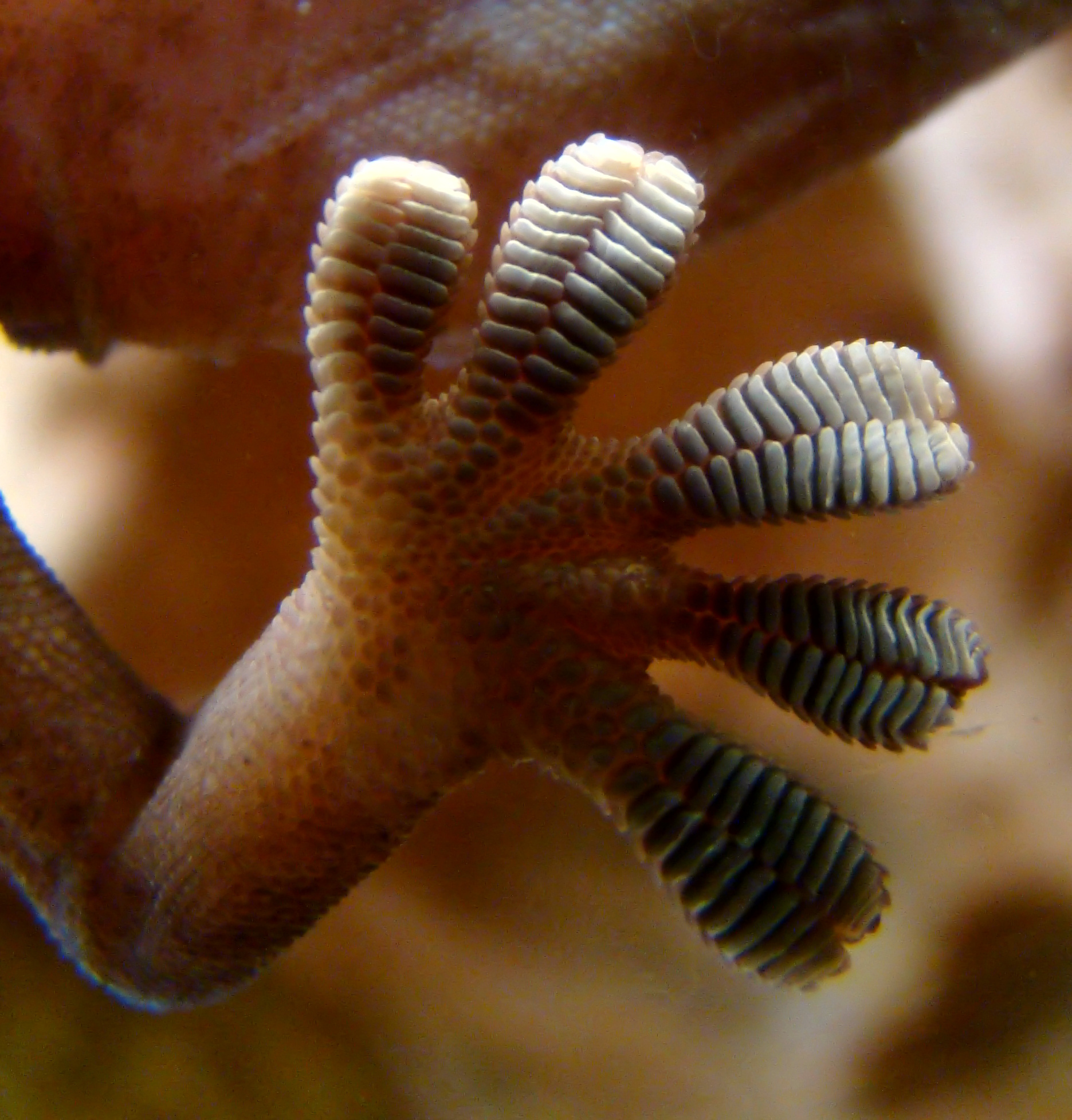
Close view of a gecko's foot

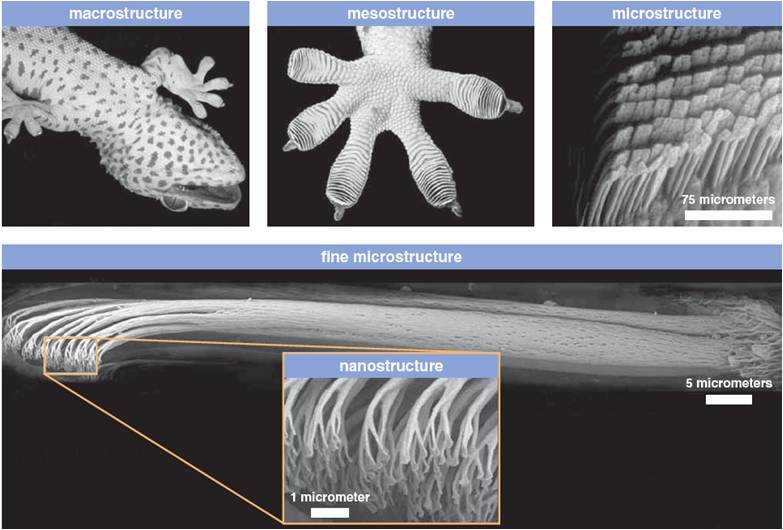
Micro and nano view of gecko's toe
