= Nano-suction technology =

Vacuum based Weight Lifting Technology

Nano-suction is a technology that uses vacuum, negative fluid pressure and millions of nano-sized suction cups to securely adhere any object to a flat non-porous surface. When the nano-suction object is pressed against a flat surface, millions of miniature suction cups create a large vacuum, generating a strong suction force that can hold a tremendous amount of weight. The nature of the technology allows easy removal without residue, and makes it reusable.

== Applications ==
There have been a wide range of applications of nano-suction technology, also known as "anti-gravity", ranging from hooks, frames, mirrors, notepad organisers, mobile phone cases and large houseware products.

== See also ==
- Synthetic setae
- Suction cup
