= Synthetic setae =

Artificial dry adhesives

Stickybot, a climbing robot using synthetic setae

Synthetic setae emulate the setae found on the toes of a gecko and scientific research in this area is driven towards the development of dry adhesives. Geckos have no difficulty mastering vertical walls and are apparently capable of adhering themselves to just about any surface. The five-toed feet of a gecko are covered with elastic hairs called setae and the ends of these hairs are split into nanoscale structures called spatulae (because of their resemblance to actual spatulas). The sheer abundance and proximity to the surface of these spatulae make it sufficient for van der Waals forces alone to provide the required adhesive strength. Following the discovery of the gecko's adhesion mechanism in 2002, which is based on van der Waals forces, biomimetic adhesives have become the topic of a major research effort. These developments are poised to yield families of novel adhesive materials with superior properties which are likely to find uses in industries ranging from defense and nanotechnology to healthcare and sport.

== Basic principles ==
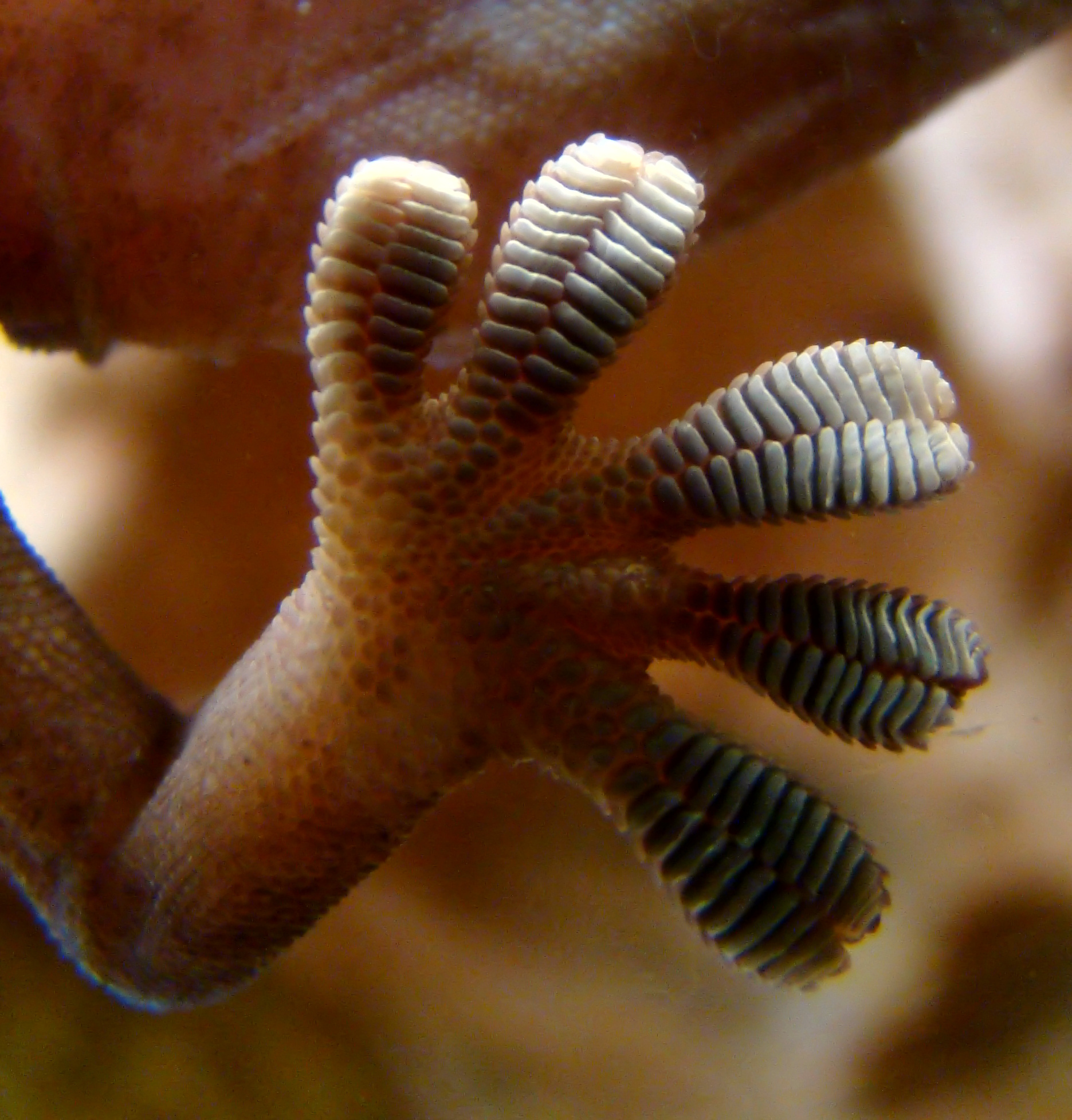
Close view of a gecko's foot

Geckos are renowned for their exceptional ability to stick and run on any vertical and inverted surface (excluding Teflon). However gecko toes are not sticky in the usual way like chemical adhesives. Instead, they can detach from the surface quickly and remain quite clean around everyday contaminants even without grooming.

=== Extraordinary adhesion ===
The two front feet of a tokay gecko can withstand 20.1 N of force parallel to the surface with 227 mm^{2} of pad area, a force as much as 40 times the gecko's weight. Scientists have been investigating the secret of this extraordinary adhesion ever since the 19th century, and at least seven possible mechanisms for gecko adhesion have been discussed over the past 175 years. There have been hypotheses of glue, friction, suction, electrostatics, micro-interlocking and intermolecular forces. Sticky secretions were ruled out first early in the study of gecko adhesion since geckos lack glandular tissue on their toes. The friction hypothesis was also dismissed quickly because the friction force only acts in shear which cannot explain the adhesive capabilities of geckos on inverted surfaces. The hypothesis that the toe pads act as suction cups was dispelled in 1934 by experiments carried out in a vacuum in which the gecko's toes remained stuck. Similarly, the electrostatic hypothesis was refuted by an experiment showing that geckos could still adhere even when the build-up of electrostatic charge was impossible (such as on a metal surface in air ionized by a stream of x-rays). The mechanism of microinterlocking which suggested that the curved tips of setae could act as microscale hooks was also challenged by the fact that geckos generate large adhesive forces even on molecularly smooth surfaces.

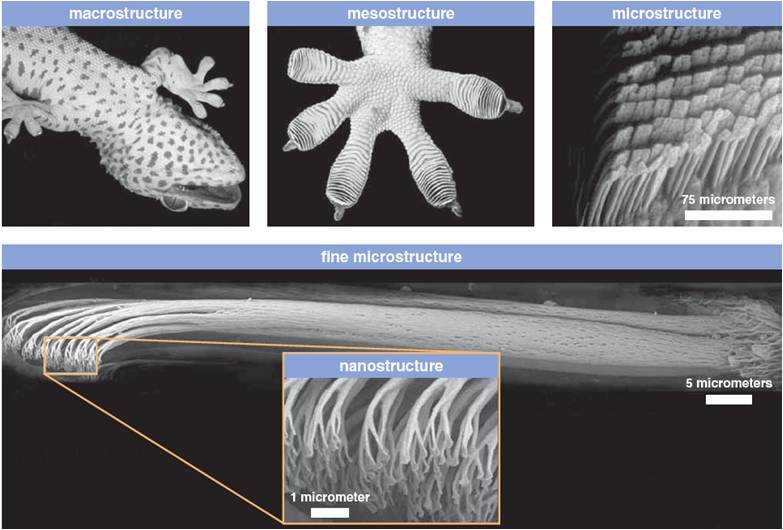
Micro and nano view of gecko's toe

The possibilities finally narrowed down to intermolecular forces, and the development of electron microscopy in the 1950s, which revealed the micro-structure of the setae on the gecko's foot, provided further proof to support this hypothesis. The problem was finally solved in 2000 by a research team led by biologists Kellar Autumn of Lewis & Clark College in Portland, Oregon, and Robert Full at the University of California at Berkeley. They showed that the underside of a gecko toe typically bears a series of ridges, which are covered with uniform ranks of setae, and each seta further divides into hundreds of split ends and flat tips called spatulas (see figure on the right). A single seta of the tokay gecko is roughly 110 micrometers long and 4.2 micrometers wide. Each of a seta's branches ends in a thin, triangular spatula connected at its apex. The end is about 0.2 micrometers long and 0.2 micrometers wide. The adhesion between gecko's foot and the surfaces is exactly the result of the Van der Waals force between each seta and the surface molecules. A single seta can generate up to 200 μN of force. There are about 14,400 setae per square millimeter on the foot of a tokay gecko, which leads to a total number of about 3,268,800 setae on a tokay gecko's two front feet. From the equation for intermolecular potential:

$$\Phi (R,D)=-\frac{\rho_1\rho_2\pi^2\alpha R}{6 D}$$

where $\rho_1$ and $\rho_2$ are the number of contacts of the two surfaces, R is the radius of each contact and D is the distance between the two surfaces.

We find that the intermolecular force, or the van der Waals force in this case between two surfaces is greatly dominated by the number of contacts. This is exactly the reason why the gecko's feet can generate extraordinary adhesion force to different kinds of surfaces. The combined effect of millions of spatulae provides an adhesive force many times greater than the gecko needs to hang from a ceiling by one foot.

Attach and detach procedure of gecko's foot

=== Lift-off mechanism ===
The surprisingly large forces generated by the gecko's toes raised the question of how geckos manage to lift their feet so quickly – in just 15 milliseconds – with no measurable detachment forces. Kellar Autumn and his research group found out the 'Lift-off mechanism' of the gecko's feet. Their discovery revealed that gecko adhesive actually works in a 'programmable' way that by increasing the angle between the setal shaft and the substrate to 30 degrees, no matter how big the perpendicular adhesive force is, geckos 'turn off' the stickiness since the increased stress at the trailing edge of the seta causes the bonds between seta and the substrate to break. The seta then returns to an unloaded default state. On the other hand, by applying preload and dragging along the surface, the geckos turn on the modulate stickiness. This 'Lift-off' mechanism can be shown in the figure on the right.

=== Self-cleaning ability ===
Unlike conventional adhesives, gecko adhesive becomes cleaner with repeated use, and thus stays quite clean around everyday contaminants such as sand, dust, leaf litter and pollen. In addition, unlike some plants and insects that have the ability of self-cleaning by droplets, geckos are not known to groom their feet in order to retain their adhesive properties – all they need is only a few steps to recover their ability to cling to vertical surfaces.

Model explaining self-cleaning ability

Kellar Autumn and his research group have conducted experiments to test and demonstrate this ability of the gecko. They also use the contact mechanical model to suggest that self-cleaning occurs by an energetic disequilibrium between the adhesive forces attracting a dirt particle to the substrate and those attracting the same particle to one or more spatulae. In other words, the Van der Waals interaction energy for the particle-wall system requires a sufficiently great number of particle-spatula systems to counterbalance; however, relatively few spatulae can actually attach to a single particle, therefore the contaminant particles tend to attach to the substrate surface rather than the gecko's toe due to this disequilibrium. Figure on the right shows the model of interaction between N spatulas, a dirt particle and a planar wall.

It is important to know that this property of self-cleaning appears intrinsic to the setal nano-structure and therefore should be replicable in synthetic adhesive materials. In fact, Kellar Autumn's group observed how self-cleaning still occurred in arrays of setae when isolated from the geckos used.

== Development and approaches ==
Number of papers published on "gecko adhesive" 2002~2007

The discoveries about gecko's feet led to the idea that these structures and mechanisms might be exploited in a new family of adhesives, and research groups from around the world are now investigating this concept. And thanks to the development of nano science and technology, people are now able to create biomimetic adhesive inspired by gecko's setae using nanostructures. Indeed, interest and new discoveries in gecko-type adhesives are booming, as illustrated by the growing number of papers published on this topic. however, synthetic setae are still at a very early stage.

=== Effective design ===
Effective design of geckolike adhesives will require deep understanding of the principles underlying the properties observed in the natural system. These properties, principles, and related parameters of the gecko adhesive system are shown in the following table. This table also gives us an insight into how scientists translate those good properties of gecko's setae (as shown in the first column) into the parameters they can actually control and design (as shown in the third column).

Properties	Principles	parameters
1. Anisotropic attachment 2. High μ' (pulloff/preload)	Cantilever beam	Shaft length, radius, density, shaft angle
3. Low detachment force	Low effective stiffness	Shaft modulus, spatular shape
4. Material independence stickiness	Van der Waals mechanism JKR-like^{*} contact mechanics Nanoarray (divided contact)	Spatular size, spatular shape, spatular density
5. Self-cleaning ability	Nanoarray (divided contact)	Spatular bulk modulus
6. Anti-self-stickiness	Small contact area	Particle size, shape, surface energy
7. Nonsticky default state	Nonsticky spatulae, hydrophobic, Van der Waals force	Spatular size, shape, surface energy

*JKR refers to the Johnson, Kendall, Roberts model of adhesion

In summary, the key parameters in the design of synthetic gecko adhesive include:

- Pattern and periodicity of the synthetic setae
- Hierarchical structure
- Length, diameter, angle and stiffness of the shafts
- Size, shape and stiffness of the spatulas (end of the satae)
- Flexibility of the substrate

There is a growing list of benchmark properties that can be used to evaluate the effectiveness of synthetic setae, and the adhesion coefficient, which is defined as:

$\mu^'=F_\text{adhesion}/F_\text{preload}$

where $F_\text{preload}$ is the applied preload force, and $F_\text{adhesion}$ is the generated adhesion force. The adhesion coefficient of real gecko setae is typically 8~16.

=== Materials ===
In the first developments of synthetic setae, polymers like polyimide, polypropylene and polydimethylsiloxane (PDMS) are frequently used since they are flexible and easily fabricated. Later, as nanotechnology rapidly developed, Carbon Nanotubes (CNTs) are preferred by most research groups and used in most recent projects. CNTs have much larger possible length-to-diameter ratio than polymers, and they exhibit both extraordinary strength and flexibility, as well as good electrical properties. It is these novel properties that make synthetic setae more effective.

=== Fabrication techniques ===
A number of MEMS/NEMS fabrication techniques are applied to the fabrication of synthetic setae, which include photolithography/electron beam lithography, plasma etching, deep reactive ion etching (DRIE), chemical vapor deposition (CVD), and micro-molding, etc.

=== Examples ===
In this section, several typical examples will be given to show the design and fabrication process of synthetic setae. We can also gain an insight into the development of this biomimetic technology over the past few years from these examples.

==== Gecko tape ====
This example is one of the first developments of synthetic setae, which arose from a collaboration between the Manchester Centre for Mesoscience and Nanotechnology, and the Institute for Microelectronics Technology in Russia. Work started in 2001 and 2 years later results were published in Nature Materials.

The group prepared flexible fibers of polyimide as the synthetic setae structures on the surface of a 5 μm thick film of the same material using electron beam lithography and dry etching in an oxygen plasma. The fibres were 2 μm long, with a diameter of around 500 nm and a periodicity of 1.6 μm, and covered an area of roughly 1 cm^{2} (see figure on the left). Initially, the team used a silicon wafer as a substrate but found that the tape's adhesive power increased by almost 1,000 times if they used a soft bonding substrate such as Scotch tape – This is because the flexible substrate yields a much higher ratio of the number of setae in contact with the surface over the total number of setae.

The result of this "gecko tape" was tested by attaching a sample to the hand of a 15 cm high plastic Spider-Man figure weighing 40 g, which enabled it to stick to a glass ceiling, as is shown in the figure. The tape, which had a contact area of around 0.5 cm^{2} with the glass, was able to carry a load of more than 100 g. However, the adhesion coefficient was only 0.06, which is low compared with real geckos (8~16).

==== Synthetic gecko foot hair ====
Micro view of the "Polypropylene Synthetic Gecko Foot Hair"

As nanoscience and nanotechnology develop, more projects involve the application of nanotechnology, notably the use of carbon nanotubes (CNTs). In 2005, researchers from the University of Akron and Rensselaer Polytechnic Institute, both in the US, created synthetic setae structures by depositing multiwalled CNTs by chemical vapour deposition onto quartz and silicon substrates.

The nanotubes were typically 10–20 nm in diameter and around 65 μm long. The group then encapsulated the vertically aligned nanotubes in PMMA polymer before exposing the top 25 μm of the tubes by etching away some of the polymer. The nanotubes tended to form entangled bundles about 50 nm in diameter because of the solvent drying process used after etching (as is shown in the figure on the right).

The results were tested with a scanning probe microscope, and it showed that the minimum force per unit area as 1.6±0.5×10^{−2} nN/nm^{2}, which is far larger than the figure the team estimated for the typical adhesive force of a gecko's setae, which was 10^{−4} nN/nm^{2}. Later experiments with the same structures on Scotch tape revealed that this material could support a shear stress of 36 N/cm^{2}, nearly four times higher than a gecko foot. This was the first time synthetic setae exhibited better properties than those of natural gecko foot. Moreover, this new material can adhere to a wider variety of materials, including glass and Teflon.

This new material has some problems, though. When pulled parallel to a surface, the tape releases, not because the CNTs lose adhesion from the surface but because they break, and the tape cannot be reused in this case. Moreover, unlike gecko's setae, this material only works for small area (approx. 1 cm^{2}). The researchers are currently working on a number of ways to strengthen the nanotubes and are also aiming to make the tape reusable thousands of times, rather than the dozens of times it can now be used.

==== Geckel ====
Micro view of the geckel

While most developments concern dry adhesion, a group of researchers studied how derivatives of naturally occurring adhesive compounds from mollusks could be combined with gecko-type structures to yield adhesives that operate in both dry and wet conditions.

The resulting adhesive, named 'geckel', was described to be an array of gecko-mimetic, 400 nm wide silicone pillars, fabricated by electron-beam lithography and coated with a mussel-mimetic polymer, a synthetic form of the amino acid that occurs naturally in mussels (left)..

Unlike true gecko glue, the material depends on van der Waals forces for its adhesive properties and on the chemical interaction of the surface with the hydroxyl groups in the mussel protein. The material improves wet adhesion 15-fold compared with uncoated pillar arrays. The so-called "geckel" tape adheres through 1,000 contact and release cycles, sticking strongly in both wet and dry environments.

So far, the material has been tested on silicon nitride, titanium oxide and gold, all of which are used in the electronics industry. However, for it to be used in bandages and medical tape, a key potential application, it must be able to adhere to human skin. The researchers tested other mussel-inspired synthetic proteins that have similar chemical groups and found that they adhere to living tissue.

Geckel is an adhesive that can attach to both wet and dry surfaces. Its strength "comes from coating fibrous silicone, similar in structure to a gecko's foot, with a polymer that mimics the 'glue' used by mussels."

The team drew inspiration from geckos, who can support hundreds of times their own body weight. Geckos rely on billions of hair-like structures, known as setae to adhere. Researchers combined this ability with the sticking power of mussels. Tests showed that "the material could be stuck and unstuck more than 1,000 times, even when used under water", retaining 85 percent of their adhesive strength.

Phillip Messersmith, lead researcher on the team that developed the product, believes that the adhesive could have many medical applications, for example tapes that could replace sutures to close a wound and a water resistant adhesive for bandages and drug-delivery patches.

=== Commercial production ===
Automated, high-volume fabrication techniques will be necessary for these adhesives to be produced commercially and were being investigated by several research groups. A group led by Metin Sitti from Carnegie Mellon University studied a range of different techniques which include deep reactive ion etching (DRIE), which has been used successfully to fabricate mushroom-shaped polymer fibre arrays, micro-moulding processes, direct self-assembly and photolithography.

In 2006, researchers at BAE Systems Advanced Technology Centre at Bristol, UK, announced that they had produced samples of "synthetic gecko" – arrays of mushroom-shaped hairs of polyimide – by photolithography, with diameters up to 100 μm. These were shown to stick to almost any surface, including those covered in dirt, and a pull-off of 3,000 kg/m^2 was measured. More recently, the company has used the same technique to create patterned silicon moulds to produce the material and has replaced the polyimide with polydimethylsiloxane (PDMS). This latest material exhibited a strength of 220 kPa. Photo-lithography has the benefit of being widely used, well understood and scalable up to very large areas cheaply and easily, which is not the case with some of the other methods used to fabricate prototype materials.

In 2019, researchers from Akron Ascent Innovations, LLC, a company spun-out from University of Akron technology, announced the commercial availability of "ShearGrip" brand dry adhesives. Rather than relying on photolithography or other micro-fabrication strategies, the researchers employed electrospinning to produce small diameter fibers based on the principle of contact splitting exploited by geckos. The product has reported shear strength greater than 80 pounds per square inch, with clean removal and reusability on many surfaces, and the ability to laminate the material to various face stocks in one or two sided constructions. The approach is claimed to be more scalable than other strategies to produce synthetic setae and has been used to produce products for consumer markets under the brand name Pinless.

== Applications ==
There have been a wide range of applications of synthetic setae, also known as "gecko tape," ranging from nanotechnology and military uses to health care and sport.

=== Nano tape ===
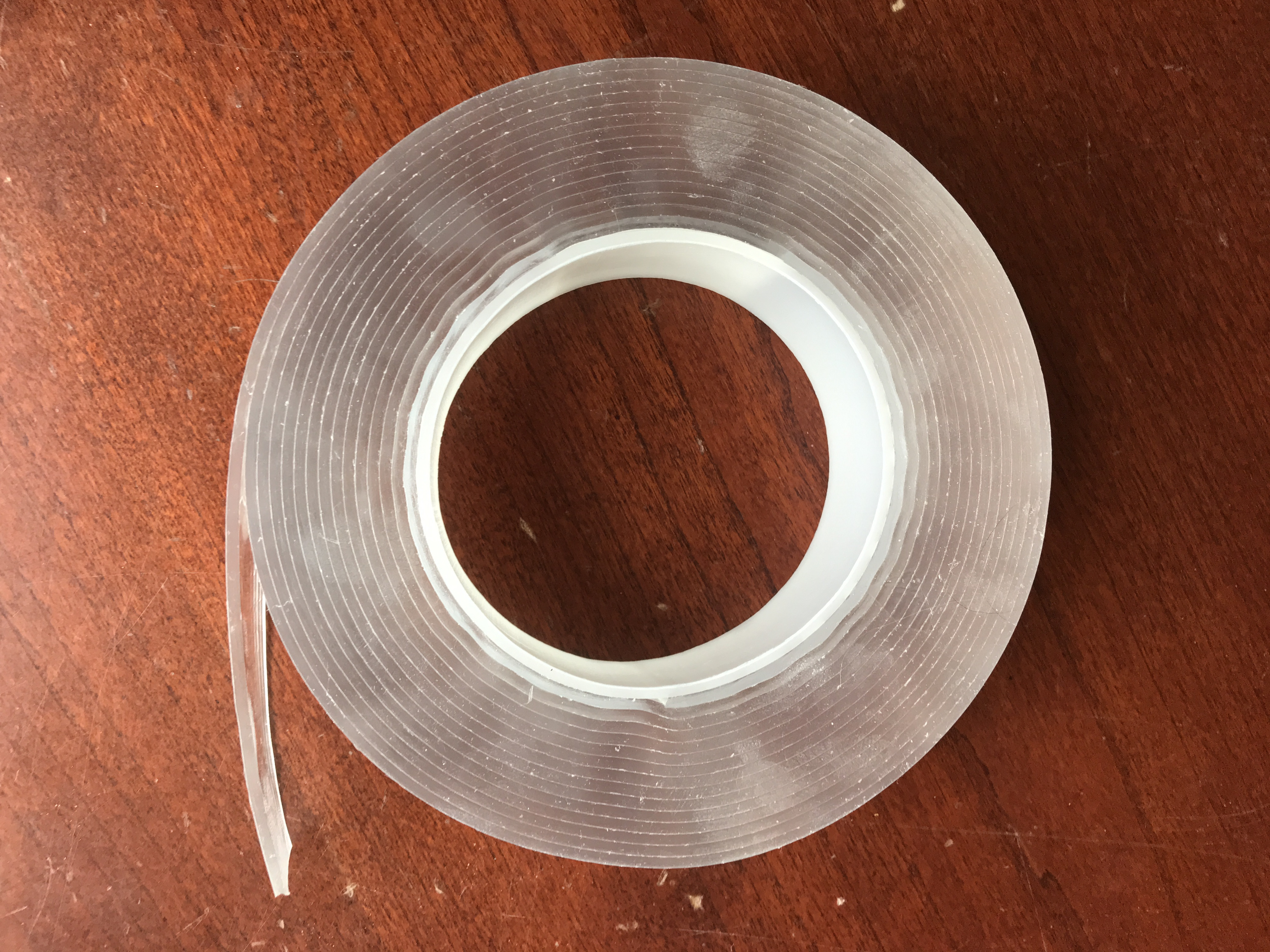
Nano tape

"Nano tape" (also called "gecko tape") is often sold commercially as double-sided adhesive tape. It can be used to hang lightweight items such as pictures and decorative items on smooth walls without punching holes in the wall. The carbon nanotube arrays leave no residue after removal and can stay sticky in extreme temperatures.

=== Robotics ===
No machine yet exists that can maneuver in the "scansorial" regime – that is, perform nimbly in general vertical terrain environments without loss of competence in level ground operation. Two major research challenges face the development of scansorial robotics: First, they seek to understand, characterize and implement the dynamics of climbing (wall reaction forces, limb trajectories, surface interactions, etc.); and second, they must design, fabricate and deploy adhesive patch technologies that yield appropriate adhesion and friction properties to facilitate necessary surface interactions.

As progress continues in legged robotics, research has begun to focus on developing robust climbers. Various robots have been developed that climb flat vertical surfaces using suction, magnets, and arrays of small spines, to attach their feet to the surface.

==== RiSE platform ====
The RiSE platform was developed in Biomimetics and Dexterous Manipulation Laboratory, Stanford University. It has twelve degrees of freedom (DOF), with six identical two DOF mechanisms spaced equally in pairs along the length of the body. Two actuators on each hip drive a four bar mechanism, which is converted to foot motion along a prescribed trajectory, and positions the plane of the four bar mechanism angularly with respect to the platform. For the RiSE robot to succeed in climbing in both natural and man-made environments it has proven necessary to use multiple adhesion mechanisms. The RiSE robot does not, but will use dry adhesion in combination with spines.

More recently, robots have been developed that utilize synthetic adhesive materials for climbing smooth surfaces such as glass.

These crawler and climbing robots can be used in the military context to examine the surfaces of aircraft for defects and are starting to replace manual inspection methods. Today's crawlers use vacuum pumps and heavy-duty suction pads which could be replaced by this material.

==== Stickybot ====
Researchers at Stanford University have also created a robot called Stickybot which uses synthetic setae in order to scale even extremely smooth vertical surfaces just as a gecko would.

Stickybot is an embodiment of the hypotheses about the requirements for mobility on vertical surfaces using dry adhesion. The main point is that we need controllable adhesion. The essential ingredients are:

- hierarchical compliance for conforming at centimeter, millimeter and micrometer scales,
- anisotropic dry adhesive materials and structures so that we can control adhesion by controlling shear,
- distributed active force control that works with compliance and anisotropy to achieve stability.

==== Geckobot ====
Another similar example is "Geckobot" developed in Carnegie Mellon University, which has climbed at angles of up to 60°.

=== Joint replacement ===
Adhesives based on synthetic setae have been proposed as a means of picking up, moving and aligning delicate parts such as ultra-miniature circuits, nano-fibres and nanoparticles, microsensors and micro-motors. In the macro-scale environment, they could be applied directly to the surface of a product and replace joints based on screws, rivets, conventional glues and interlocking tabs in manufactured goods. In this way, both assembly and disassembly processes would be simplified. It would also be beneficial to replace conventional adhesive with synthetic gecko adhesive in vacuum environment (e.g. in space) since the liquid ingredient in conventional adhesive would easily evaporate and causes the connection to fail.
