= Van der Waals force =

Interactions between groups of atoms that do not arise from chemical bonds

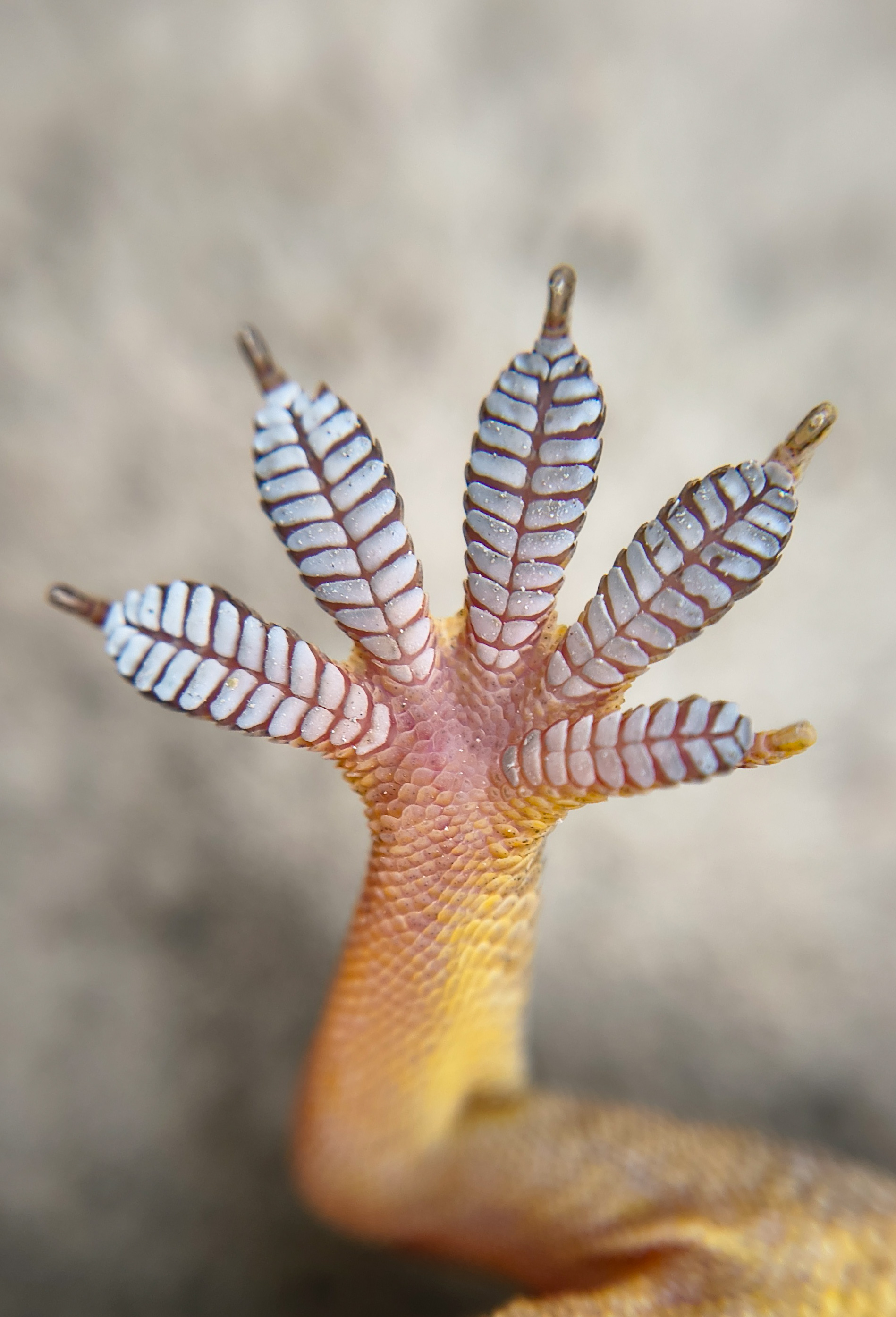
Gecko feet use thousands of microscopic hairs to generate Van der Waals forces, allowing them to cling to most objects.

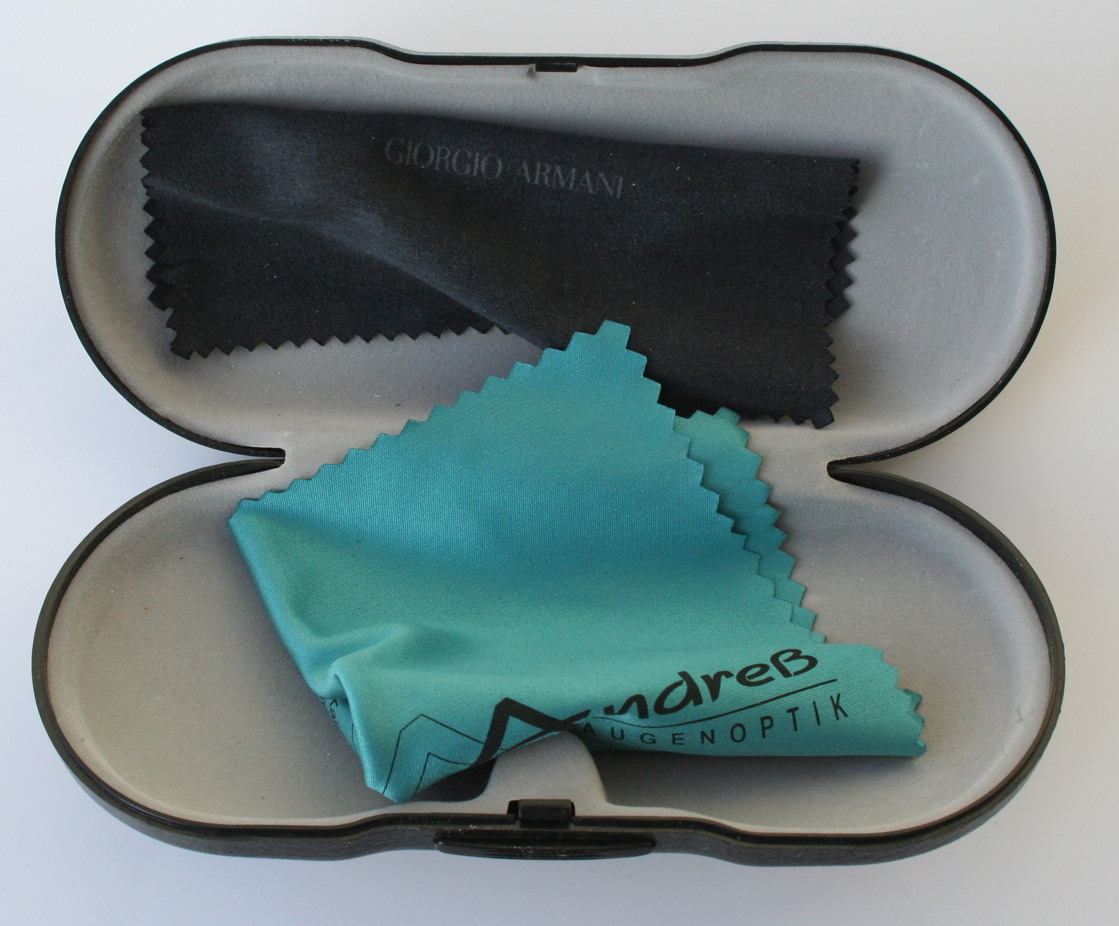
Microfiber cloth makes use of van der Waals force to remove dirt without scratches.

In molecular physics and chemistry, the van der Waals force (sometimes van der Waals' force) is a distance-dependent interaction between atoms or molecules and one of the category of intermolecular force. Unlike ionic or covalent bonds, these attractions do not result from a chemical electronic bond; they are comparatively weak and therefore more susceptible to disturbance. The van der Waals force quickly vanishes at longer distances between interacting molecules.

Named after Dutch physicist Johannes Diderik van der Waals, the Van der Waals force plays a fundamental role in fields as diverse as supramolecular chemistry, structural biology, polymer science, nanotechnology, surface science, and condensed matter physics. It also underlies many properties of organic compounds and molecular solids, including their solubility in polar and non-polar media.

If no other force is present, the distance between atoms at which the force becomes repulsive rather than attractive as the atoms approach one another is called the van der Waals contact distance; this phenomenon results from the mutual repulsion between the atoms' electron clouds.

The Van der Waals forces are usually described as a combination of the London dispersion forces between "instantaneously induced dipoles", Debye forces between permanent dipoles and induced dipoles, and the Keesom force between permanent molecular dipoles whose rotational orientations are dynamically averaged over time.

== Definition ==
Van der Waals forces include attraction and repulsions between atoms, molecules, as well as other intermolecular forces. They differ from covalent and ionic bonding in that they are caused by correlations in the fluctuating polarizations of nearby particles (a consequence of quantum dynamics).

The force results from a transient shift in electron density. Specifically, the electron density may temporarily shift to be greater on one side of the nucleus. This shift generates a transient charge which a nearby atom can be attracted to or repelled by. The force is repulsive at very short distances, reaches zero at an equilibrium distance characteristic for each atom, or molecule, and becomes attractive for distances larger than the equilibrium distance. For individual atoms, the equilibrium distance is between 0.3 nm and 0.5 nm, depending on the atomic-specific diameter. When the interatomic distance is greater than 1.0 nm the force is not strong enough to be easily observed as it decreases as a function of distance r approximately with the 7th power (~r^{−7}).

Van der Waals forces are often among the weakest chemical forces. For example, the pairwise attractive van der Waals interaction energy between H (hydrogen) atoms in different H_{2} molecules equals 0.06 kJ/mol (0.6 meV) and the pairwise attractive interaction energy between O (oxygen) atoms in different O_{2} molecules equals 0.44 kJ/mol (4.6 meV). The corresponding vaporization energies of H_{2} and O_{2} molecular liquids, which result as a sum of all van der Waals interactions per molecule in the molecular liquids, amount to 0.90 kJ/mol (9.3 meV) and 6.82 kJ/mol (70.7 meV), respectively, and thus approximately 15 times the value of the individual pairwise interatomic interactions (excluding covalent bonds).

The strength of van der Waals bonds increases with higher polarizability of the participating atoms. For example, the pairwise Van der Waals interaction energy for more polarizable atoms such as S (sulfur) atoms in H_{2}S and sulfides exceeds 1 kJ/mol (10 meV), and the pairwise interaction energy between even larger, more polarizable Xe (xenon) atoms is 2.35 kJ/mol (24.3 meV). These van der Waals interactions are up to 40 times stronger than in H_{2}, which has only one valence electron, and they are still not strong enough to achieve an aggregate state other than gas for Xe (noble gas) under standard conditions. The interactions between atoms in metals can also be effectively described as van der Waals interactions and account for the observed solid aggregate state with bonding strengths comparable to covalent and ionic interactions. The strength of pairwise van der Waals type interactions is on the order of 12 kJ/mol (120 meV) for low-melting Pb (lead) and on the order of 32 kJ/mol (330 meV) for high-melting Pt (platinum), which is about one order of magnitude stronger than in Xe due to the presence of a highly polarizable free electron gas. Accordingly, van der Waals forces can range from weak to strong interactions, and support integral structural loads when multitudes of such interactions are present.

=== Force contributions ===
More broadly, intermolecular forces have several possible contributions. They are ordered from strongest to weakest:

1. A repulsive component resulting from the Pauli exclusion principle that prevents close contact of atoms, or the collapse of molecules.
2. Attractive or repulsive electrostatic interactions between permanent charges (in the case of molecular ions), dipoles (in the case of molecules without inversion centre), quadrupoles (all molecules with symmetry lower than cubic), and in general between permanent multipoles. These interactions also include hydrogen bonds, cation-pi, and pi-stacking interactions. Orientation-averaged contributions from electrostatic interactions are sometimes called the Keesom interaction or Keesom force after Willem Hendrik Keesom.
3. Induction (also known as polarization), which is the attractive interaction between a permanent multipole on one molecule with an induced multipole on another. This interaction is sometimes called Debye force after Peter J. W. Debye. The interactions (2) and (3) are labelled polar Interactions.
4. Dispersion (usually named London dispersion interactions after Fritz London), which is the attractive interaction between any pair of molecules, including non-polar atoms, arising from the interactions of instantaneous multipoles.

When to apply the term "van der Waals" force depends on the text. The broadest definitions include all intermolecular forces which are electrostatic in origin, namely (2), (3) and (4). Some authors, whether or not they consider other forces to be of van der Waals type, focus on (3) and (4) as these are the components which act over the longest range.

All intermolecular/Van der Waals forces are anisotropic (except those between two noble gas atoms), which means that they depend on the relative orientation of the molecules. The induction and dispersion interactions are always attractive, irrespective of orientation, but the electrostatic interaction changes sign upon rotation of the molecules. That is, the electrostatic force can be attractive or repulsive, depending on the mutual orientation of the molecules. When molecules are in thermal motion, as they are in the gas and liquid phase, the electrostatic force is averaged out to a large extent because the molecules thermally rotate and thus probe both repulsive and attractive parts of the electrostatic force.

Random thermal motion can disrupt or overcome the electrostatic component of the van der Waals force but the averaging effect is much less pronounced for the attractive induction and dispersion forces.

The Lennard-Jones potential is often used as an approximate model for the isotropic part of a total (repulsion plus attraction) van der Waals force as a function of distance.

Van der Waals forces are responsible for certain cases of pressure broadening (van der Waals broadening) of spectral lines and the formation of van der Waals molecules. The London–van der Waals forces are related to the Casimir effect for dielectric media, the former being the microscopic description of the latter bulk property. The first detailed calculations of this were done in 1955 by E. M. Lifshitz. A more general theory of van der Waals forces has also been developed.

The main characteristics of van der Waals forces are:

- They are weaker than normal covalent and ionic bonds.
- The van der Waals forces are additive in nature, consisting of several individual interactions, and cannot be saturated.
- They have no directional characteristic.
- They are all short-range forces and hence only interactions between the nearest particles need to be considered (instead of all the particles). Van der Waals attraction is greater if the molecules are closer.
- Van der Waals forces are independent of temperature except for dipole-dipole interactions.

In low molecular weight alcohols, the hydrogen-bonding properties of their polar hydroxyl group dominate other weaker van der Waals interactions. In higher molecular weight alcohols, the properties of the nonpolar hydrocarbon chain(s) dominate and determine their solubility.

Van der Waals forces are also responsible for the weak hydrogen bond interactions between unpolarized dipoles particularly in acid-base aqueous solution and between biological molecules.

== London dispersion force ==
London dispersion forces, named after the German-American physicist Fritz London, are weak intermolecular forces that arise from the interactive forces between instantaneous multipoles in molecules without permanent multipole moments. In and between organic molecules the multitude of contacts can lead to larger contribution of dispersive attraction, particularly in the presence of heteroatoms. London dispersion forces are also known as 'dispersion forces', 'London forces', or 'instantaneous dipole–induced dipole forces'. The strength of London dispersion forces is proportional to the polarizability of the molecule, which in turn depends on the total number of electrons and the area over which they are spread. Hydrocarbons display small dispersive contributions, the presence of heteroatoms lead to increased LDFs as function of their polarizability, e.g. in the sequence RI>RBr>RCl>RF. In absence of solvents weakly polarizable hydrocarbons form crystals due to dispersive forces; their sublimation heat is a measure of the dispersive interaction.

== Van der Waals forces between macroscopic objects ==
For macroscopic bodies with known volumes and numbers of atoms or molecules per unit volume, the total van der Waals force is often computed based on the "microscopic theory" as the sum over all interacting pairs. It is necessary to integrate over the total volume of the object, which makes the calculation dependent on the objects' shapes. For example, the van der Waals interaction energy between spherical bodies of radii R_{1} and R_{2} and with smooth surfaces was approximated in 1937 by Hamaker (using London's famous 1937 equation for the dispersion interaction energy between atoms/molecules as the starting point) by:

$$\begin{align} &U(z;R_{1},R_{2}) = -\frac{A}{6}\left(\frac{2R_{1}R_{2}}{z^2 - (R_{1} + R_{2})^2} + \frac{2R_{1}R_{2}}{z^2 - (R_{1} - R_{2})^2} + \ln\left[\frac{z^2-(R_{1}+ R_{2})^2}{z^2-(R_{1}- R_{2})^2}\right]\right) \end{align}$$	1

where A is the Hamaker coefficient, which is a constant (~10^{−19} − 10^{−20} J) that depends on the material properties (it can be positive or negative in sign depending on the intervening medium), and z is the center-to-center distance; i.e., the sum of R_{1}, R_{2}, and r (the distance between the surfaces): $\ z = R_{1} + R_{2} + r$.

The Van der Waals force between two spheres of constant radii (R_{1} and R_{2} are treated as parameters) is then a function of separation since the force on an object is the negative of the derivative of the potential energy function,$\ F_{\rm VdW}(z) = -\frac{d}{dz}U(z)$. This yields:

$\ F_{\rm VdW}(z)= -\frac{A}{6}\frac{64R_{1}^3R_{2}^3z}{[z^2-(R_{1}+R_{2})^2]^2[z^2-(R_{1}-R_{2})^2]^2}$	2

In the limit of close-approach, the spheres are sufficiently large compared to the distance between them; i.e., $\ r \ll R_{1}$ or $R_{2}$, so that equation (1) for the potential energy function simplifies to:

$\ U(r;R_{1},R_{2})= -\frac{AR_{1}R_{2}}{(R_{1}+R_{2})6r}$	3

with the force:

$\ F_{\rm VdW}(r)= -\frac{AR_{1}R_{2}}{(R_{1}+R_{2})6r^2}$	4

The van der Waals forces between objects with other geometries using the Hamaker model have been published in the literature.

From the expression above, it is seen that the van der Waals force decreases with decreasing size of bodies (R). Nevertheless, the strength of inertial forces, such as gravity and drag/lift, decrease to a greater extent. Consequently, the van der Waals forces become dominant for collections of very small particles such as very fine-grained dry powders (where there are no capillary forces present) even though the force of attraction is smaller in magnitude than it is for larger particles of the same substance. Such powders are said to be cohesive, meaning they are not as easily fluidized or pneumatically conveyed as their more coarse-grained counterparts. Generally, free-flow occurs with particles greater than about 250 μm.

The Van der Waals force of adhesion is also dependent on the surface topography. If there are surface asperities, or protuberances, that result in a greater total area of contact between two particles or between a particle and a wall, this increases the van der Waals force of attraction as well as the tendency for mechanical interlocking.

The microscopic theory assumes pairwise additivity. It neglects many-body interactions and retardation. A more rigorous approach accounting for these effects, called the "macroscopic theory", was developed by Lifshitz in 1956. Langbein derived a much more cumbersome "exact" expression in 1970 for spherical bodies within the framework of the Lifshitz theory while a simpler macroscopic model approximation had been made by Derjaguin as early as 1934. Expressions for the Van der Waals forces for many different geometries using the Lifshitz theory have likewise been published.

== See also ==
- Arthropod adhesion
- Cold welding
- Dispersion (chemistry)
- Gecko feet
- Lennard-Jones potential
- Nano tape
- Noncovalent interactions
- Synthetic setae
- Van der Waals molecule
- Van der Waals radius
- Van der Waals strain
- Van der Waals surface
- Wringing of gauge blocks
