= Gecko feet =

Hairy feature allowing suction

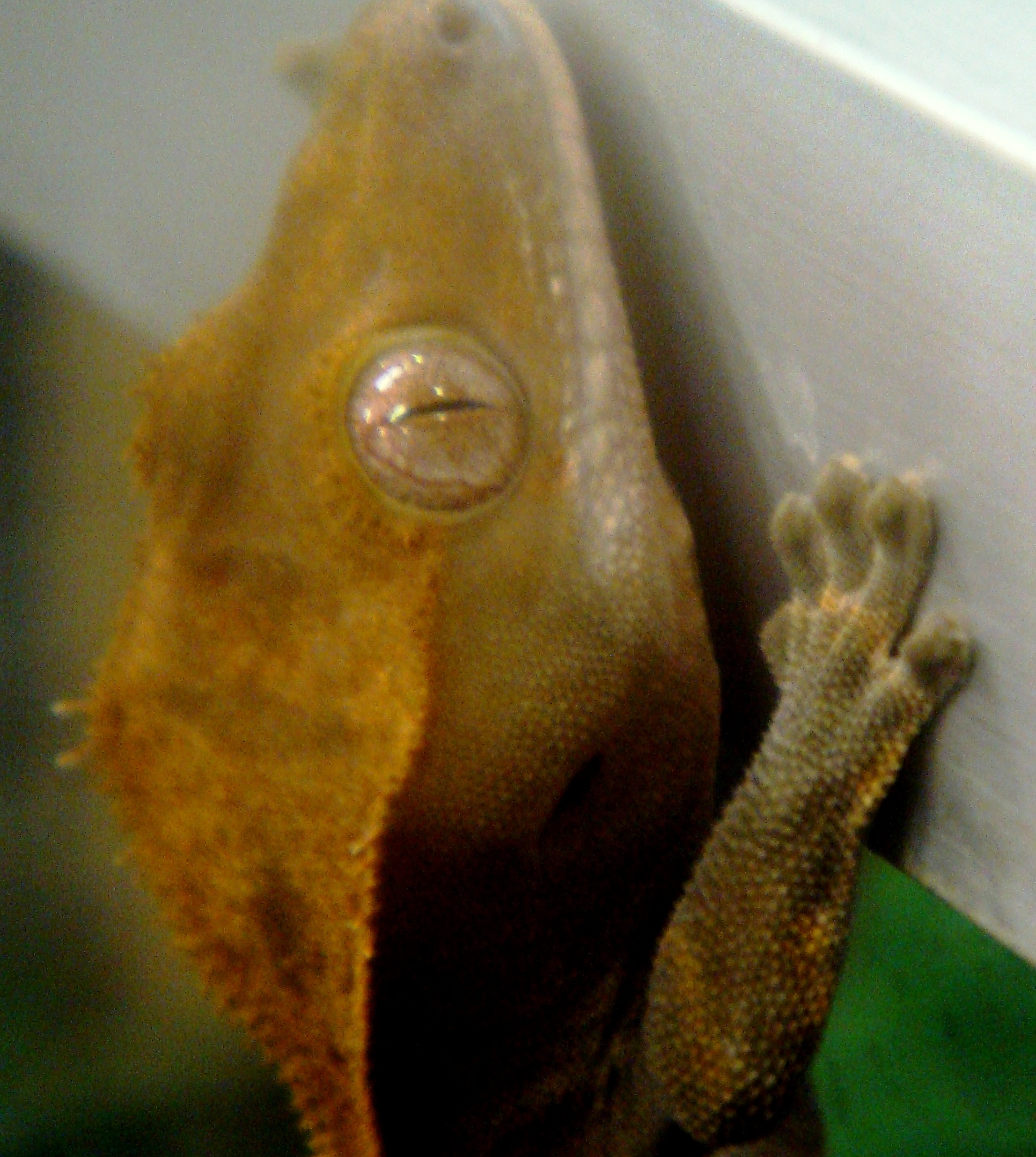
A crested gecko, Correlophus ciliatus, climbing up the vertical side of a terrarium

The feet of geckos have a number of specializations. Their surfaces can adhere to almost any type of material. This phenomenon can be explained with three elements:

- Foot structure
- Structure of the material to which the foot adheres
- The ability to adhere to a surface and become a part of it

== Background ==
Geckos are members of the suborder Gekkota. They are reptiles that inhabit temperate and tropical regions. There are over 1,000 different species of geckos. They can be a variety of colors. Geckos are omnivorous, feeding on a variety of foods, including insects and worms. Most gecko species, including the crested gecko (Correlophus ciliatus), can climb walls and other surfaces.

== Structure ==
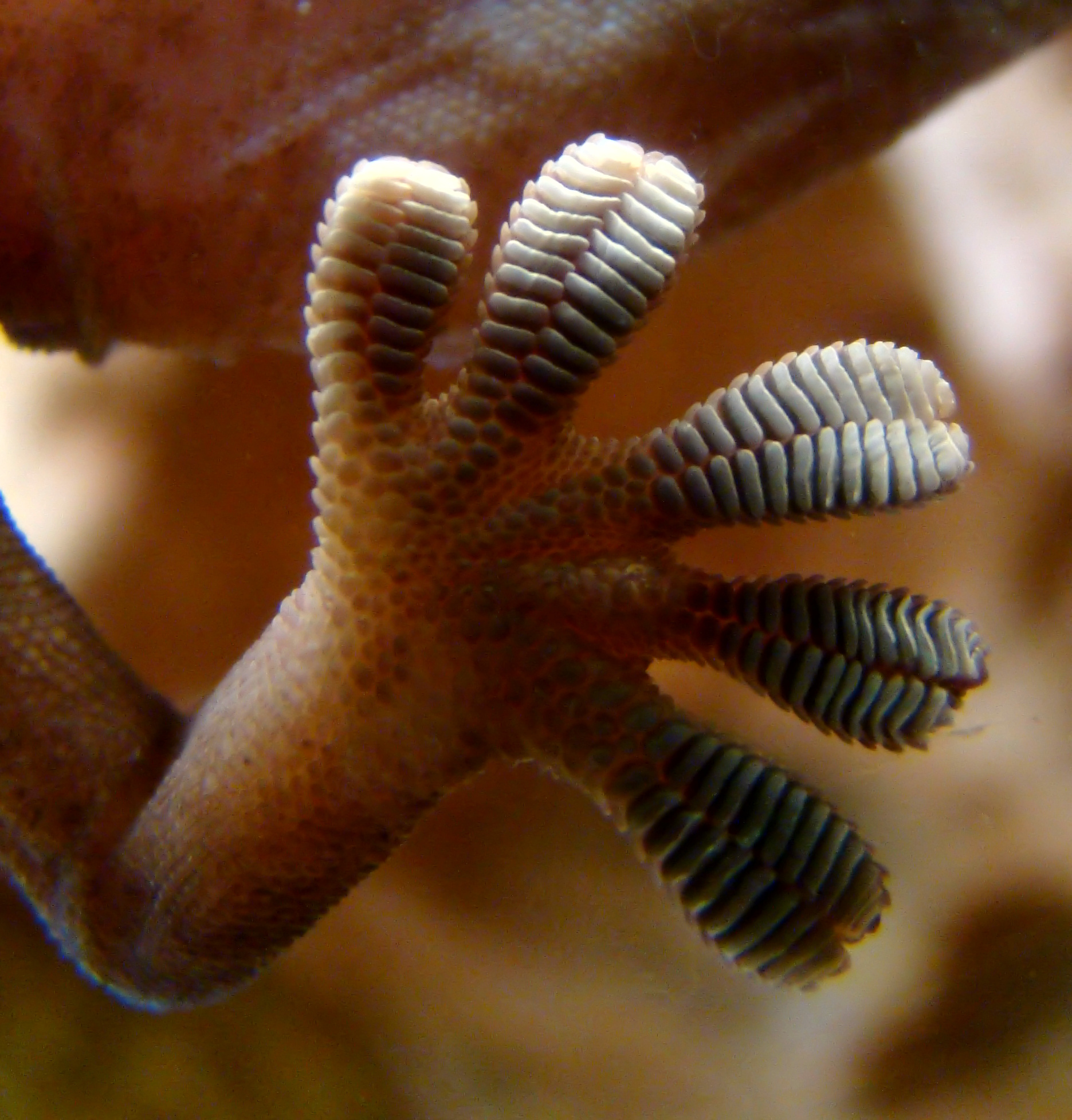
Close view of a gecko's foot

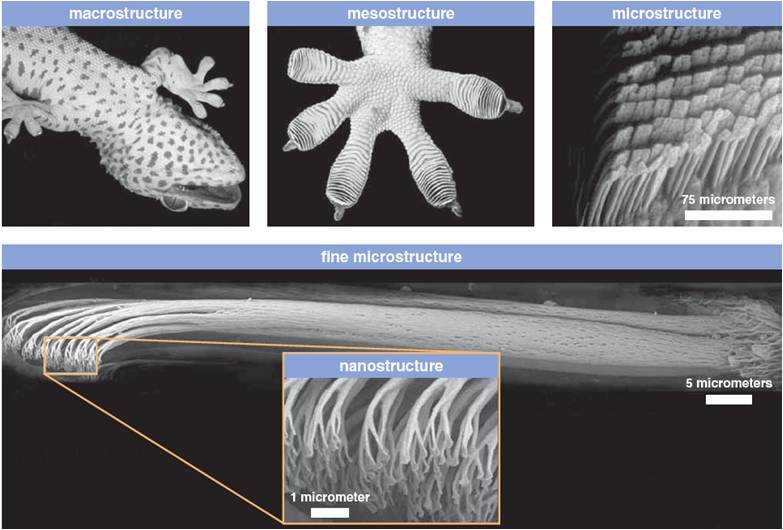
Micrometer- and nanometer-scale view of a gecko's toe

=== Chemical structure ===
The interactions between the gecko's feet and the climbing surface are stronger than simple surface area effects. On its feet, the gecko has many microscopic hairs, or setae (singular seta), arranged into lamellae that increase the Van der Waals forces - the distance-dependent attraction between atoms or molecules - between its feet and the surface. These setae are fibrous structural proteins that protrude from the epidermis, which is made of β-keratin, similar to α-keratin being the basic building block of mammalian skin and finger nails.

=== Physical structure ===
The bottom surface of a gecko's foot will consist of millions of hairy structures called setae. These setae are 5 μm long and are thinner than a human hair. There are thousands of tiny structures called spatula on every seta. Geckos create Van der Waals force by making contact with the surface of materials using their spatulas. More spatulas implies more surface area. The spatulas have sharp edges, which on application of stress in a specific angle, bends and creates more contact with the surface in order to climb on them vertically. Thus, more contact with the surface creates more Van der Waals force to support the whole body of the creature. One seta can produce an average force of 194 µN. If a gecko could simultaneously utilize all of its 6.5 million setae, it would be able to hold up a 130 kg (290 lb) weight. But in reality, a gecko can lift only 2 kg (4.4 lb) with its front feet. The β-keratin bristles are approximately 5 μm in diameter. The end of each seta consists of approximately 1,000 spatulae that are shaped like an isosceles triangle. The spatulae are approximately 200 nm on one side and 10–30 nm on the other two sides. The setae are aligned parallel to each other, but not oriented normal to the toes. When the setae contact another surface, their load is supported by both lateral and vertical components. The lateral load component is limited by the peeling of the spatulae and the vertical load component is limited by shear force.

== Van der Waals forces ==
=== Hamaker surface interaction ===
The following equation can be used to quantitatively characterize the Van der Waals forces, by approximating the interaction as being between two flat surfaces:

$$F=- \frac{A_\text{H}}{12\pi D^3}$$

where F is the force of interaction, A_{H} is the Hamaker constant, and D is the distance between the two surfaces. Gecko setae are much more complicated than a flat surface, for each foot has roughly 14,000 setae that each have about 1,000 spatulae. These surface interactions help to smooth out the surface roughness of the wall, which helps improve the gecko to wall surface interaction.

=== Factors affecting adhesion ===
Many factors affect adhesion, including:

- Surface roughness
- Adsorbed material, such as particles or moisture
- Contact surface area of the gecko's foot on the surface
- The material gradient properties (dependence of elastic modulus on the depth).

== Interaction potential derivation ==
=== Van der Waals interaction ===
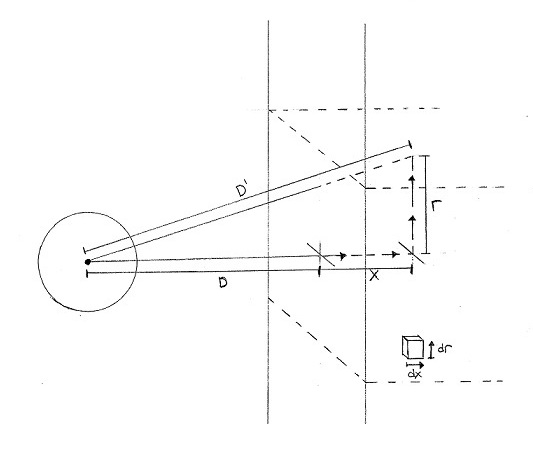
Schematic diagram representing the Van der Waals interaction between a sphere and an infinite plane.

Using the combined dipole–dipole interaction potential between molecules A and B:

$$W_\mathrm{AB}=-\frac{C_\mathrm{AB}}{D^6}$$

where W_{AB} is the potential energy between the molecules (in joules), C_{AB} is the combined interaction parameter between the molecules (in J m^{6}), and D is the distance between the molecules [in meters]. The potential energy of one molecule at a perpendicular distance D from the planar surface of an infinitely extending material can then be approximated as:

$$W_\mathrm{A,Plane}=-\iiint\limits_\text{all space} \, \frac{C_\mathrm{AB}\ \rho_\mathrm{B}}{(D')^6}dV$$

where D′ is the distance between molecule A and an infinitesimal volume of material B, and ρ_{B} is the molecular density of material B (in molecules/m^{3}). This integral can then be written in cylindrical coordinates with x being the perpendicular distance measured from the surface of B to the infinitesimal volume, and r being the parallel distance:

$$\begin{align}
W_\mathrm{A,Plane} &= -C_\mathrm{AB} \rho_\mathrm{B}\int_{0}^{\infty}\int_{0}^{\infty}\frac{2\pi r}{\left((D+x)^2+r^2\right)^3}\, dr\,dx \\
&= -\frac{\pi C_\mathrm{AB} \rho_\mathrm{B}}{2} \int_{0}^{\infty} \frac{1}{(D+x)^4}\, dx \\
&= -\frac{\pi C_\mathrm{AB} \rho_\mathrm{B}}{6D^3}
\end{align}$$

=== Modeling spatulae potential ===
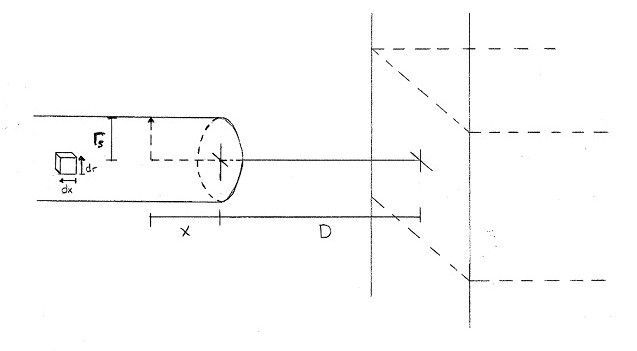
Schematic diagram representing Van der Waals interaction between a cylinder and an infinite plane.

The gecko–wall interaction can be analyzed by approximating the gecko spatula as a long cylinder with radius r_{s}. Then the interaction between a single spatula and a surface is:

$$W_\mathrm{seta,plane} = -\iiint\limits_\text{all space}\, \frac{\pi C_\mathrm{AB} \rho_\mathrm{B} \rho_\mathrm{A}}{6(D')^6}\, dV$$

where D′ is the distance between the surface of B and an infinitesimal volume of material A and ρ_{A} is the molecular density of material A (in molecules/m^{3}). Using cylindrical coordinates once again, we can find the potential between the gecko spatula and the material B then to be:

$$\begin{align}
W_\mathrm{s,p} &= -\frac{2\pi^2C_\mathrm{AB} \rho_\mathrm{A} \rho_\mathrm{B}}{6}\int_{0}^{\infty}\int_{0}^{r_\mathrm{s}}\,\frac{r}{(D+x)^3}\,dr\,dx \\
&= -\frac{\pi^2 C_\mathrm{AB} \rho_\mathrm{A} \rho_\mathrm{B} r_\mathrm{s}^2}{6}\int_{0}^{\infty}\,\frac{1}{(D+x)^3}\,dx \\
&= -\frac{\pi^2 C_\mathrm{AB} \rho_\mathrm{A} \rho_\mathrm{B} r_\mathrm{s}^2}{12D^2} \\
&= -\frac{A_\mathrm{H} r_\mathrm{s}^2}{12D^2}
\end{align}$$

where A_{H} is the Hamaker constant for the materials A and B.

The Van der Waals force per spatula, F_{s} can then be calculated by differentiating with respect to D and we obtain:

$$F_\mathrm{s} = -\left [\frac{d}{dD} (W_\mathrm{s,p})\right ] = -\frac{A_\mathrm{H} r_\mathrm{s}^2}{6D^3}$$

We can then rearrange this equation to obtain r_{s} as a function of A_{H}:

$$\begin{align}
r_\mathrm{s} &= \sqrt{\frac{6 D^3 F_\mathrm{s}}{A_\mathrm{H}}} \approx \sqrt{\frac{6(1.7 \times 10^{-10}\ \mathrm{m})^3(40 \times 10^{-6}\ \mathrm{N})}{A_\mathrm{H}}} \\
&= 3.43 \times 10^{-17} \sqrt{\mathrm{N\ m^3}} \times \frac{1}{\sqrt{A_\mathrm{H}}}
\end{align}$$

where a typical interatomic distance of 1.7 Å was used for solids in contact and a F_{s} of 40 μN was used as per a study by Autumn et al.

== Experimental verification ==
The equation for r_{s} can then be used with calculated Hamaker constants to determine an approximate seta radius. Hamaker constants through both a vacuum and a monolayer of water were used. For those with a monolayer of water, the distance was doubled to account for the water molecules.

Calculated seta radii
Materials A/B	A_{H} (10^{−20} J)	Calculated r_{s} (μm)
Hydrocarbon/Hydrocarbon (vacuum)	2.6–6.0	0.21–0.14
Hydrocarbon/Hydrocarbon (water)	0.36–0.44	1.6–1.5
Hydrocarbon/Silica (vacuum)	4.1–4.4	0.17–0.16
Hydrocarbon/Silica (water)	0.25–0.82	1.9–1.1
Albumin/Silica (water)	0.7	1.2

These values are similar to the actual radius of the setae on a gecko's foot (approx. 2.5 μm).

== Synthetic adhesives ==
Stickybot, a climbing robot using synthetic setae

Research attempts to simulate the gecko's adhesive attribute. Projects that have explored the subject include:

- Replicating the adhesive rigid polymers manufactured in microfibers that are approximately the same size as gecko setae.
- Replicating the self-cleaning attribute that naturally occurs when gecko feet accumulate particles from an exterior surface between setae.
- Carbon nanotube arrays transferred onto a polymer tape. In 2015 commercial products inspired by this work were released.

== See also ==
- Arthropod adhesion
