= Seta =

Hair-like structure on living organisms

In biology, setae (/ˈsiːtiː/; sing. seta /ˈsiːtə/; from Latin saeta 'bristle') are any of a number of different bristle- or hair-like structures on living organisms.

== Animal setae ==
=== Protostomes ===
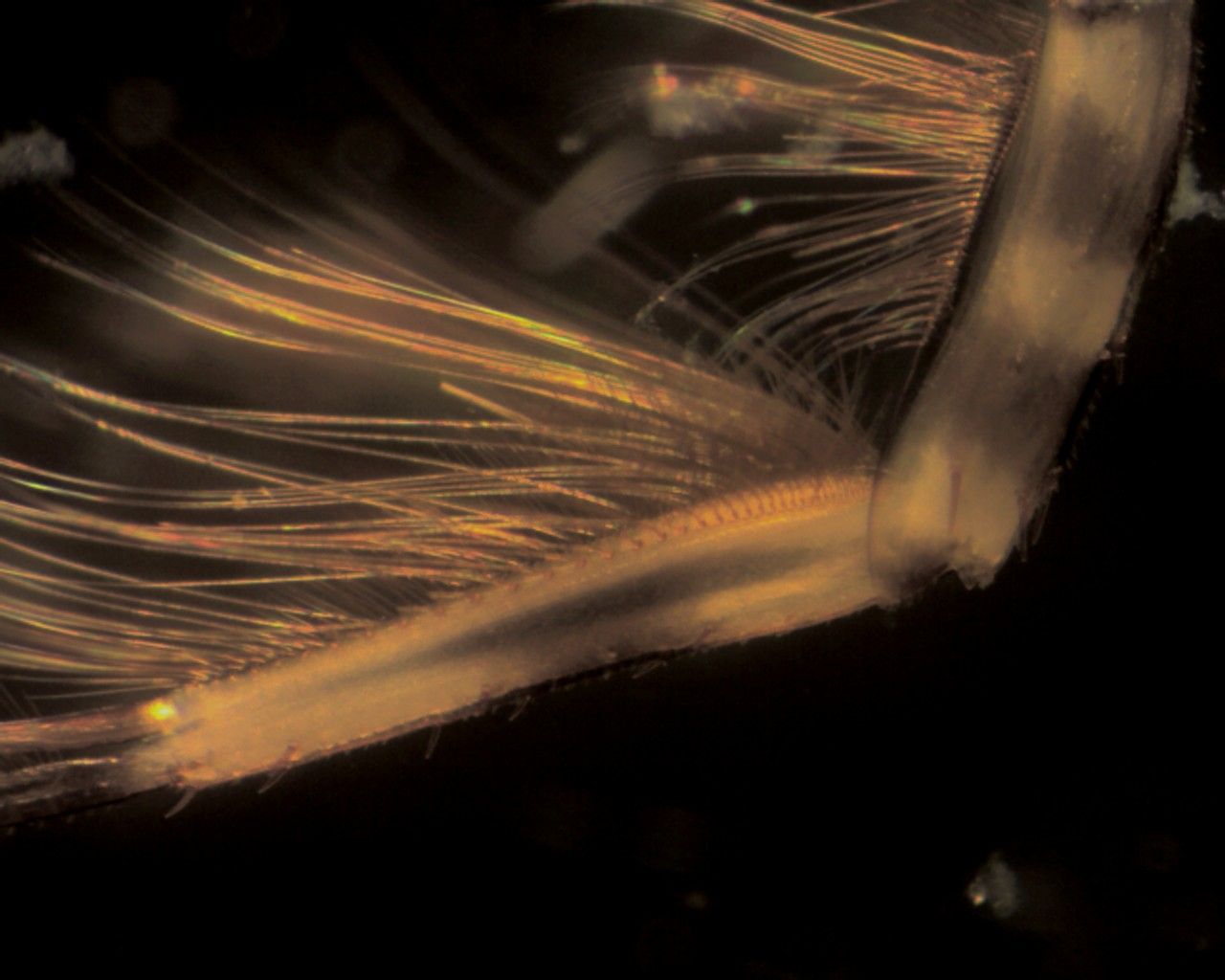
Setae on the foreleg of a mayfly

Depending partly on their form and function, protostome setae may be called macrotrichia, chaetae, scales, or informally, hairs. The setal membrane is not cuticularized, so movement is possible.

==== Annelid ====
Annelid setae are stiff bristles present on the body. They allow earthworms and their relatives to attach to the surface and prevent backsliding during peristaltic motion. These hairs make it difficult to pull a worm straight from the ground. Setae in oligochaetes (the group including earthworms) are largely composed of chitin. They are classified according to the limb to which they are attached; for instance, notosetae are attached to notopodia; neurosetae to neuropodia. The setae on polychaete worms are referred to as chaetae due to their differing morphology.

==== Crustacean ====
Crustaceans have mechano- and chemosensory setae. Setae are especially present on the mouthparts of crustaceans and can also be found on grooming limbs. In some cases, setae are modified into scale like structures. Setae on the legs of krill and other small crustaceans help them to gather phytoplankton. It captures them and allows them to be eaten.

==== Insect ====
Setae on the integument of insects are unicellular, meaning that each is formed from a single epidermal cell of a type called a trichogen, literally meaning "bristle generator". They are at first hollow and in most forms remain hollow after they have hardened. They grow through and project through a secondary or accessory cell of a type called a tormogen, which generates the special flexible membrane that connects the base of the seta to the surrounding integument. Some insects, such as Eriogaster lanestris larvae, use setae as a defense mechanism, as they can cause dermatitis when they come into contact with skin. Diptera setae are bristles present throughout the body and function as mechanoreceptors.

=== Deuterostomes ===
==== Vertebrates ====
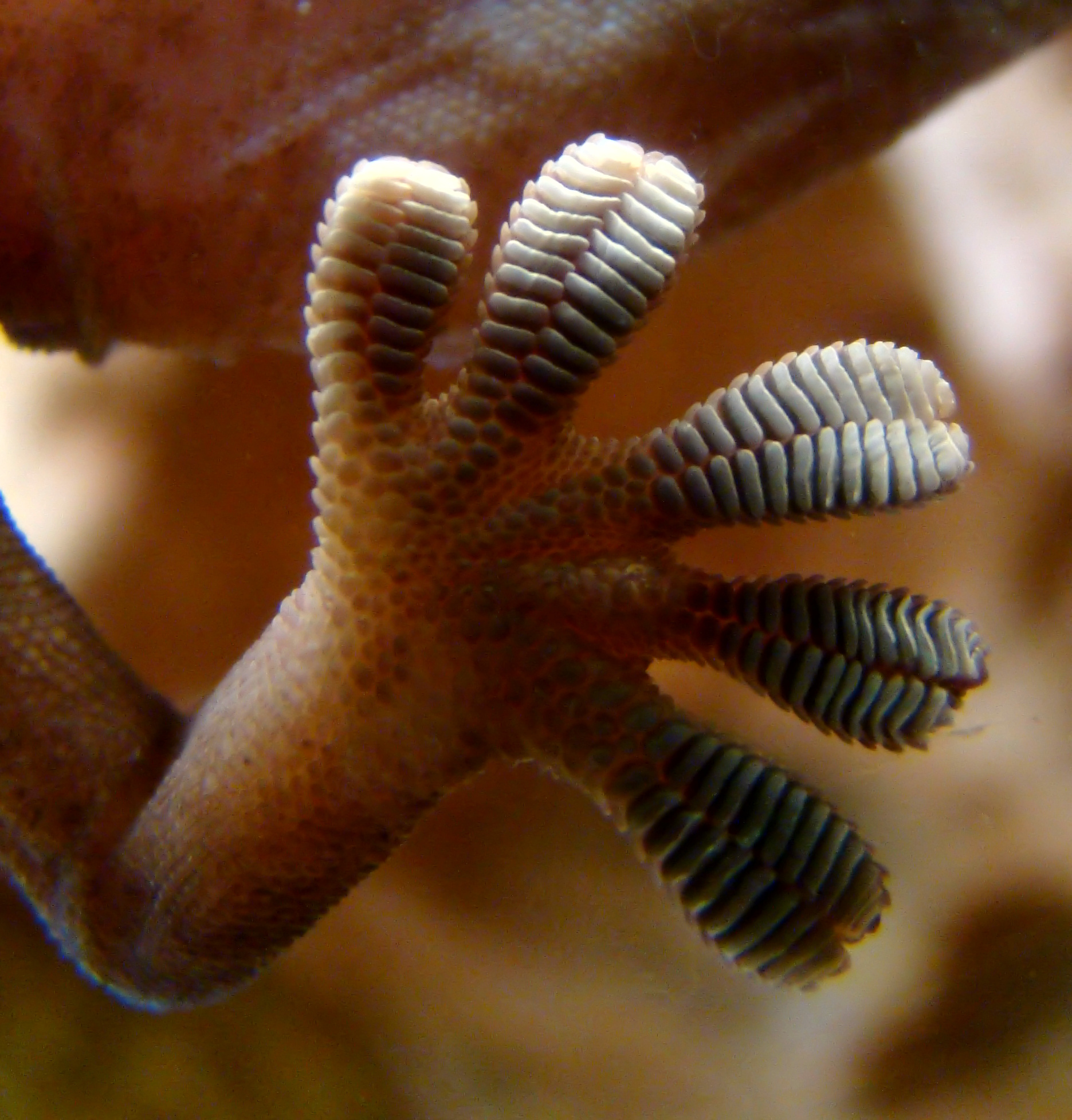
Close-up of the underside of a gecko's foot as it walks on vertical glass

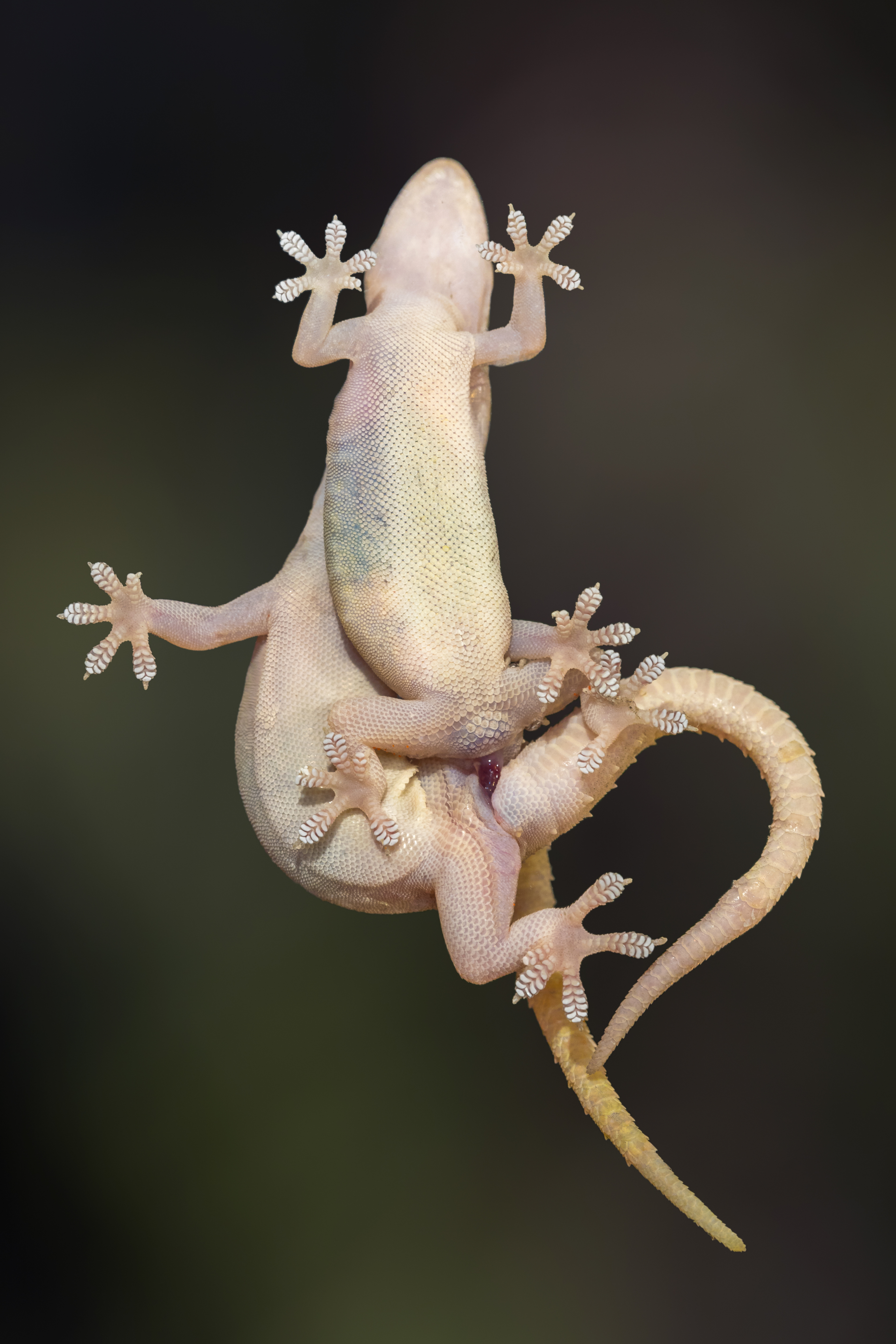
Common house geckos mating on a vertical glass window and showing lamellae under the feet

The pads on a gecko's feet are small hair-like processes that play a role in the animal's ability to cling to vertical surfaces. The micrometer-scale setae branch into nanometer-scale projections called spatulae. A Tokay gecko's two front feet can sustain 20.1 N of force parallel to the surface using approximately 14,400 setae per mm^{2}. This equates to ~ 6.2 pN per seta, but does not sufficiently account for the overall stickiness behavior shown by the foot pads.

=== Classification uncertain ===
In 2017, a description of a new species of basal deuterostome called Saccorhytus was published. This animal appears to have seta in the pores along the side of its body. However, in 2022, Saccorhytus is considered to be an early ecdysozoan, and was described as having "lacked setae".

== Fungal setae ==
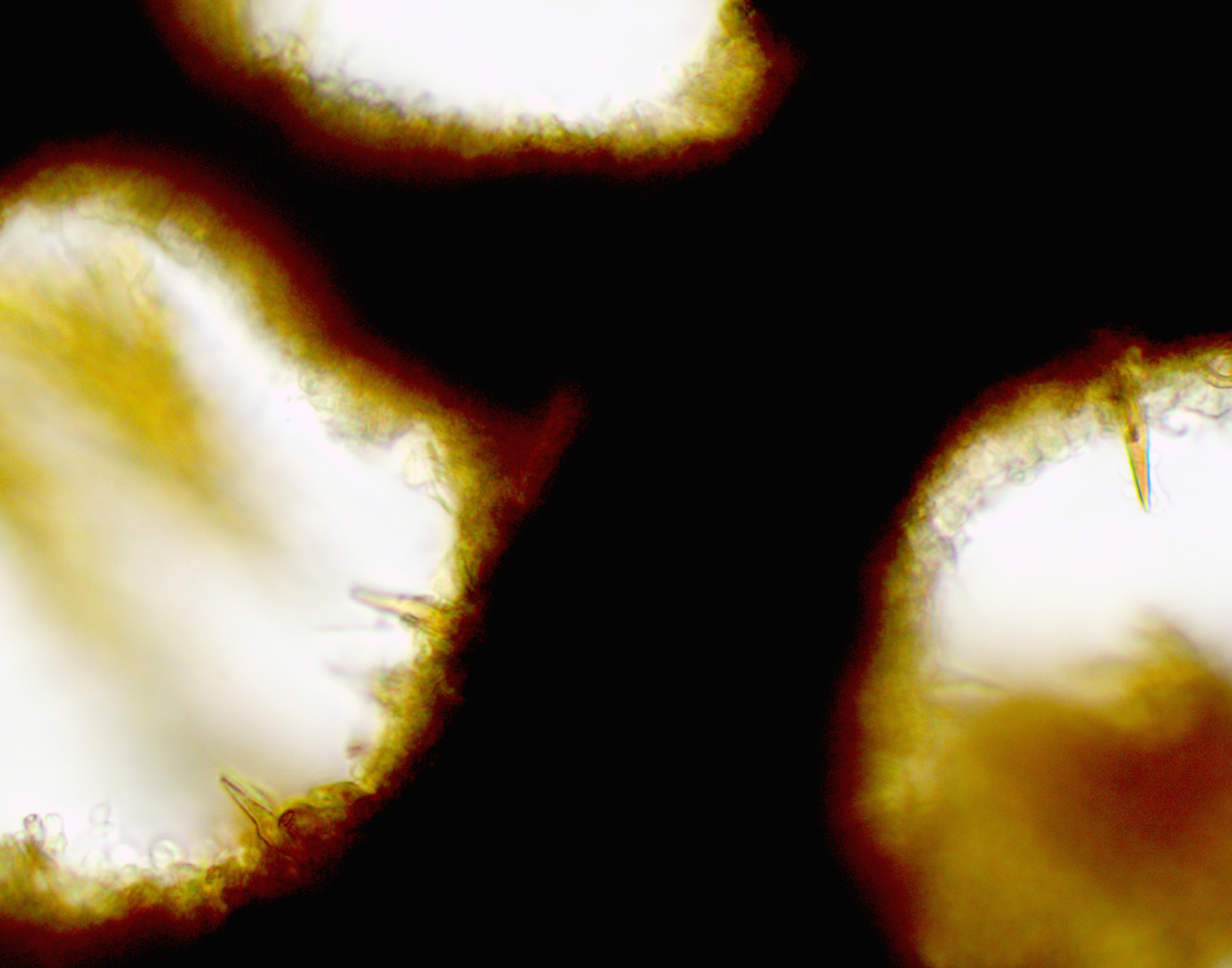
Pointed setae protruding into the fertile surface tubes of the bracket fungus Fuscoporia gilva

In mycology, "setae" refer to dark-brown, thick-walled, thornlike cystidia found in corticioid and poroid fungi in the family Hymenochaetaceae. Though mainly microscopic, the setae of some species may be sufficiently prominent to be visible with a hand lens.

== Plant setae ==
In botany, "seta" refers to the stalk supporting the capsule of a moss or liverwort (both closely related in a clade called "Setaphyta"), and supplying it with nutrients. The seta is part of the sporophyte and has a short foot embedded in the gametophyte on which it is parasitic. Setae are not present in all mosses, but in some species they may reach 15 to 20 centimeters in height.

== Chaetoceros setae ==
In the diatom family Chaetocerotaceae, "seta" refers to the hairlike outgrowths of the valve, i.e. of the face of the cells. These setae have a different structure than the valve. Such setae may prevent rapid sinking and also protect the cells from grazing.

== Synthetic setae ==
Synthetic setae are a class of synthetic adhesives that detach at will, sometimes called resettable adhesives, yet display substantial stickiness. The development of such synthetic materials is a matter of current research.

== See also ==
- Chaeta
- Synthetic setae
- Van der Waals force
