= List of Russian physicists =

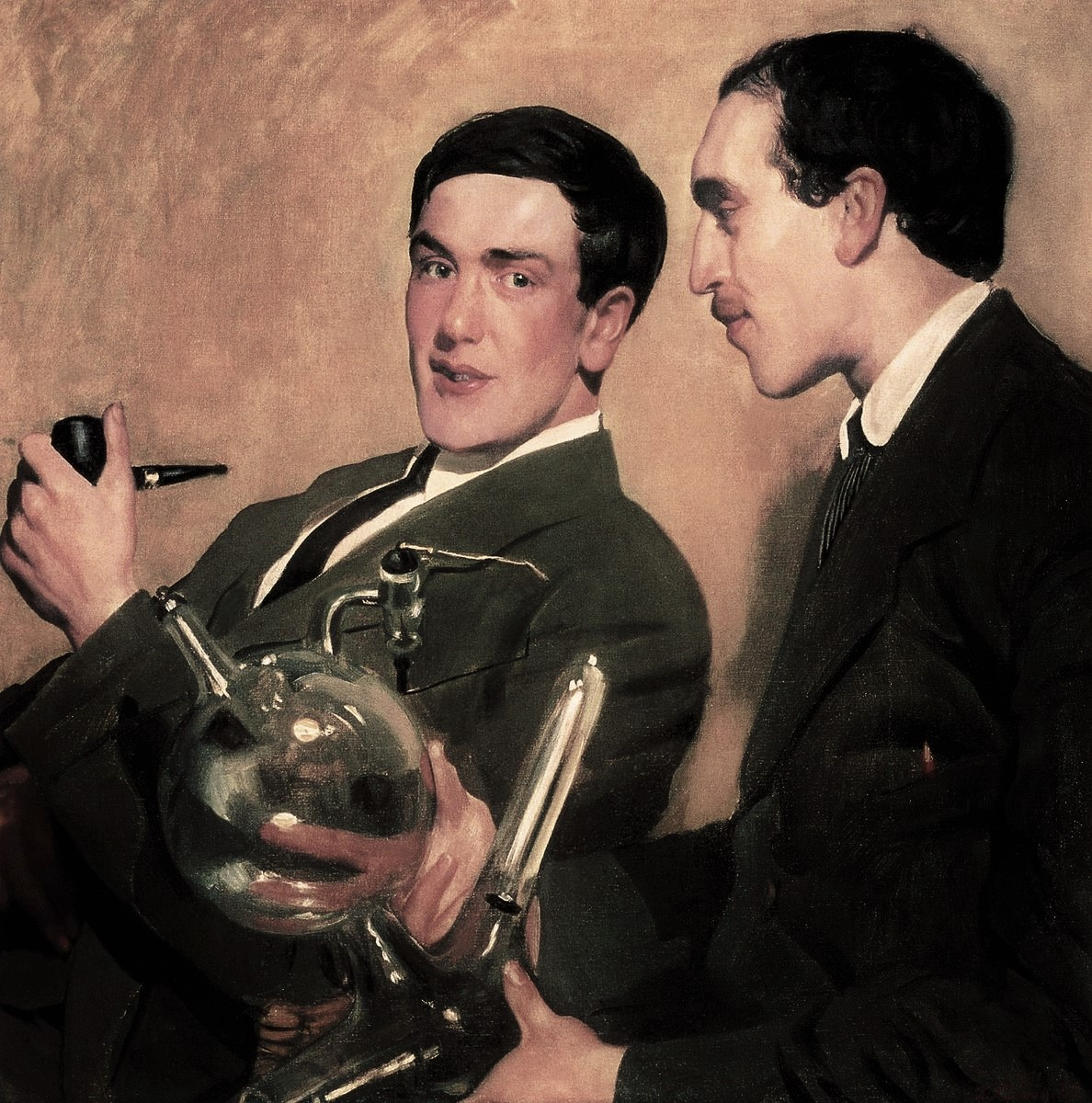
Physicist Pyotr Kapitsa (left) and physical chemist Nikolay Semyonov (right), the two Nobel laureates (portrait by Boris Kustodiev, 1921).

This list of Russian physicists includes the famous physicists from the Russian Empire, the Soviet Union and the Russian Federation.

== Alphabetical list ==
=== A ===
- Alexei Abrikosov, discovered how magnetic flux can penetrate a superconductor (the Abrikosov vortex), Nobel Prize winner
- Franz Aepinus, related electricity and magnetism, proved the electric nature of pyroelectricity, explained electric polarization and electrostatic induction, invented achromatic microscope
- Zhores Alferov, inventor of modern heterotransistor, Nobel Prize winner
- Sergey Alekseenko, director of the Kutateladze Institute of Thermophysics, Global Energy Prize recipient
- Artem Alikhanian, a prominent researcher of cosmic rays, inventor of wide-gap track spark chamber
- Abram Alikhanov, nuclear physicist, a prominent researcher of cosmic rays, built the first nuclear reactors in the USSR, founder of Institute for Theoretical and Experimental Physics (ITEP)
- Semen Altshuler, researched EPR and NMR, predicted acoustic paramagnetic resonance
- Lev Artsimovich, builder of the first tokamak, researcher of high temperature plasma
- Gurgen Askaryan, predicted self focusing of light, discovered Askaryan effect in the particle physics
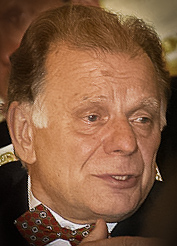
  Alferov

=== B ===
- Nikolay Basov, physicist, co-inventor of laser and maser, Nobel Prize winner
- Nikolay Bogolyubov, mathematician and theoretical physicist, co-developed the BBGKY hierarchy, formulated a microscopic theory of superconductivity, suggested a triplet quark model, introduced a new quantum degree of freedom (color charge)
- Dmitry Blokhintsev, theoretical physicist who served as the first director of the Joint Institute for Nuclear Research
- Matvei Petrovich Bronstein, theoretical physicist, a pioneer of quantum gravity, author of works in astrophysics, semiconductors, quantum electrodynamics and cosmology.
- Gersh Budker, inventor of electron cooling, co-inventor of collider

=== C ===
- Sergey Chaplygin, a founder of aero- and hydrodynamics, formulated the Chaplygin's equations and Chaplygin gas concept
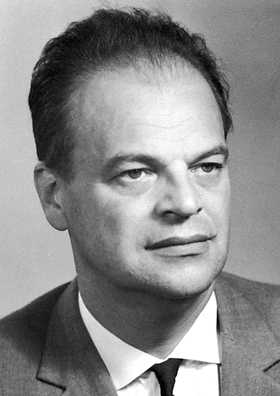
  Basov
- Pavel Cherenkov, discoverer of Cherenkov radiation, Nobel Prize winner

=== D ===
- Yuri Denisyuk, inventor of 3D holography

=== F ===
- Ludvig Faddeev, discoverer of Faddeev–Popov ghosts and Faddeev equations in quantum physics
- Georgy Flyorov, nuclear physicist, one of the initiators of the Soviet atomic bomb project, co-discoverer of seaborgium and bohrium, founder of the Joint Institute for Nuclear Research
- Vladimir Fock, developed the Fock space, Fock state and the Hartree–Fock method in quantum mechanics
- Ilya Frank, explained the phenomenon of Cherenkov radiation, Nobel Prize winner
- Vsevolod Frederiks (Fréedericksz), discovered the Fréedericksz transition, the Fréedericksz critical field in liquid crystals
- Yakov Frenkel, coined the term electron hole, discovered the Frenkel defect of a crystal lattice, described the Poole–Frenkel effect in solid-state physics

=== G ===
- Andre Geim, inventor of graphene, developer of gecko tape, Nobel Prize winner and at the same time Ig Nobel Prize winner for diamagnetic levitation of a living frog
- Vitaly Ginzburg, co-author of the Ginzburg–Landau theory of superconductivity, a developer of hydrogen bomb, Nobel Prize winner
- Vladimir Gribov, introduced pomeron, DGLAP equations and Gribov ambiguity
- Aleksandr Gurevich, author of the runaway breakdown theory of lightning

=== I ===
- Abram Ioffe, founder of the Soviet physics school, tutor of many prominent scientists
- Dmitri Ivanenko, pioneered the modelling of nuclear shell and nuclear forces, predicted synchrotron radiation, suggested the quark stars existence
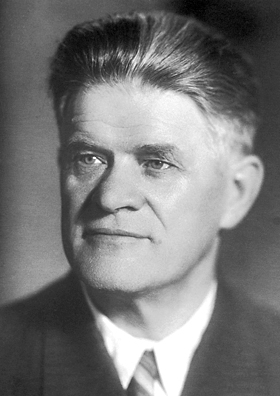
  Cherenkov

=== J ===
- Boris Jacobi, formulated the Maximum power theorem in electrical engineering, invented electroplating, electrotyping, galvanoplastic sculpture and electric boat

=== K ===
- Pyotr Kapitsa, originated the techniques for creating ultrastrong magnetic fields, co-discovered a way to measure the magnetic field of an atomic nucleus discovered superfluidity, Nobel Prize winner
- Yuly Khariton, chief designer of the Soviet atomic bomb, co-developer of the Tsar Bomb
- Orest Khvolson, first to study the Chwolson ring effect of gravitational lensing
- Nicolai Kopnin, Simon Memorial Prize winner for his work on the forces acting on quantum vortices in superfluids and superconductors
- Sergey Krasnikov, developer of the Krasnikov tube, a speculative mechanism for space travel
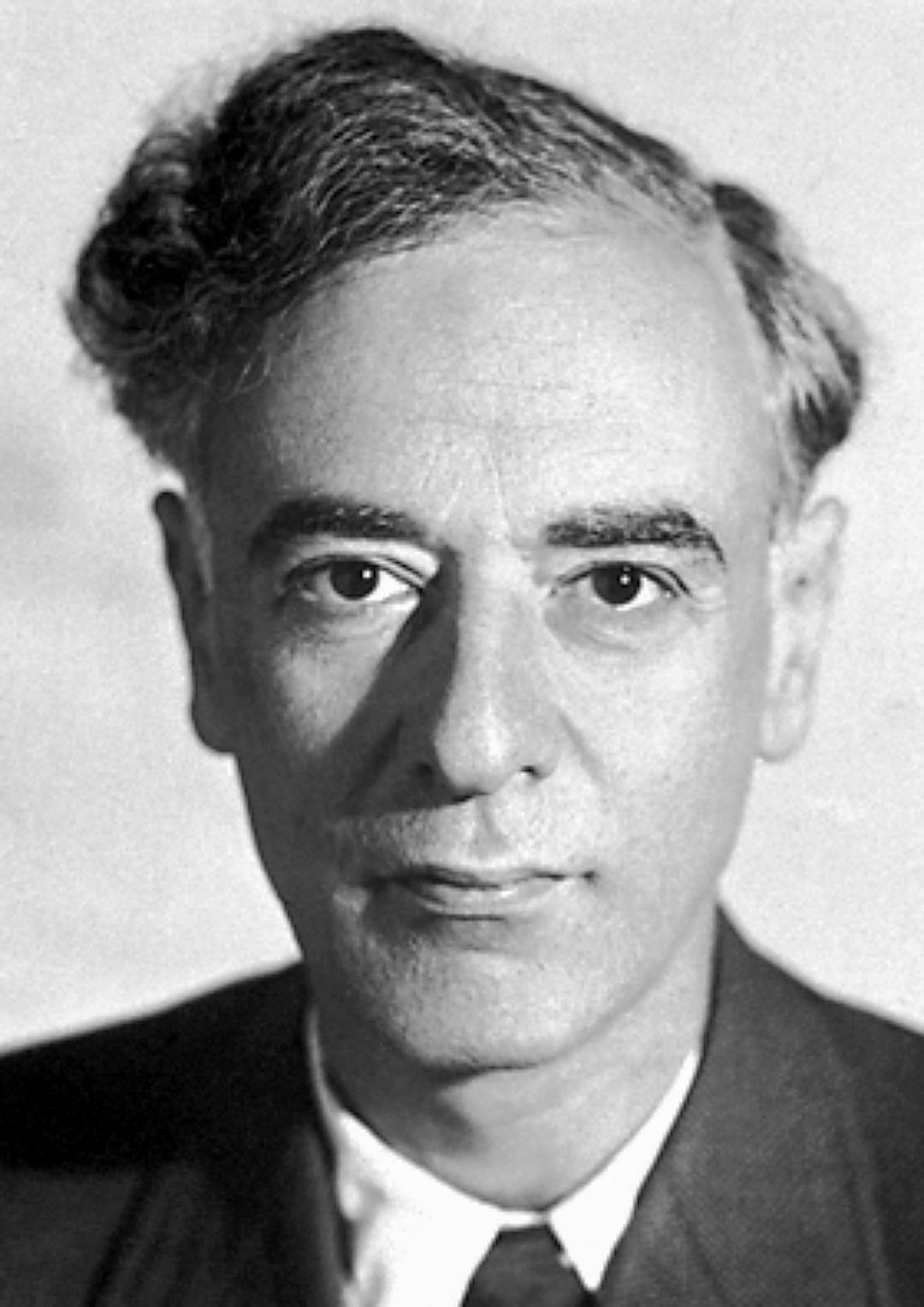
  Landau
- Igor Kurchatov, builder of the first nuclear power plant, developer of the first nuclear reactors for surface ships

=== L ===
- Lev Landau, theoretical physicist, developed the Ginzburg–Landau theory of superconductivity, explained the Landau damping in plasma physics, pointed out the Landau pole in quantum electrodynamics, co-author of the famous Course of Theoretical Physics, Nobel Prize winner
- Grigory Landsberg, co-discoverer of Raman scattering of light
- Mikhail Lavrentyev, physicist and mathematician, founded the Siberian Division of the Soviet Academy of Sciences and Akademgorodok in Novosibirsk
- Pyotr Lebedev, first to measure the radiation pressure on a solid body, thus proving the Maxwell's theory of electromagnetism
- Heinrich Lenz, discovered the Lenz's law of electromagnetism
- Aleksandr Il'ich Leipunskii, pioneered the development of fast breeder reactors in the USSR.
- Evgeny Lifshitz, an author of the BKL singularity model of the Universe evolution, co-author of the famous Course of Theoretical Physics
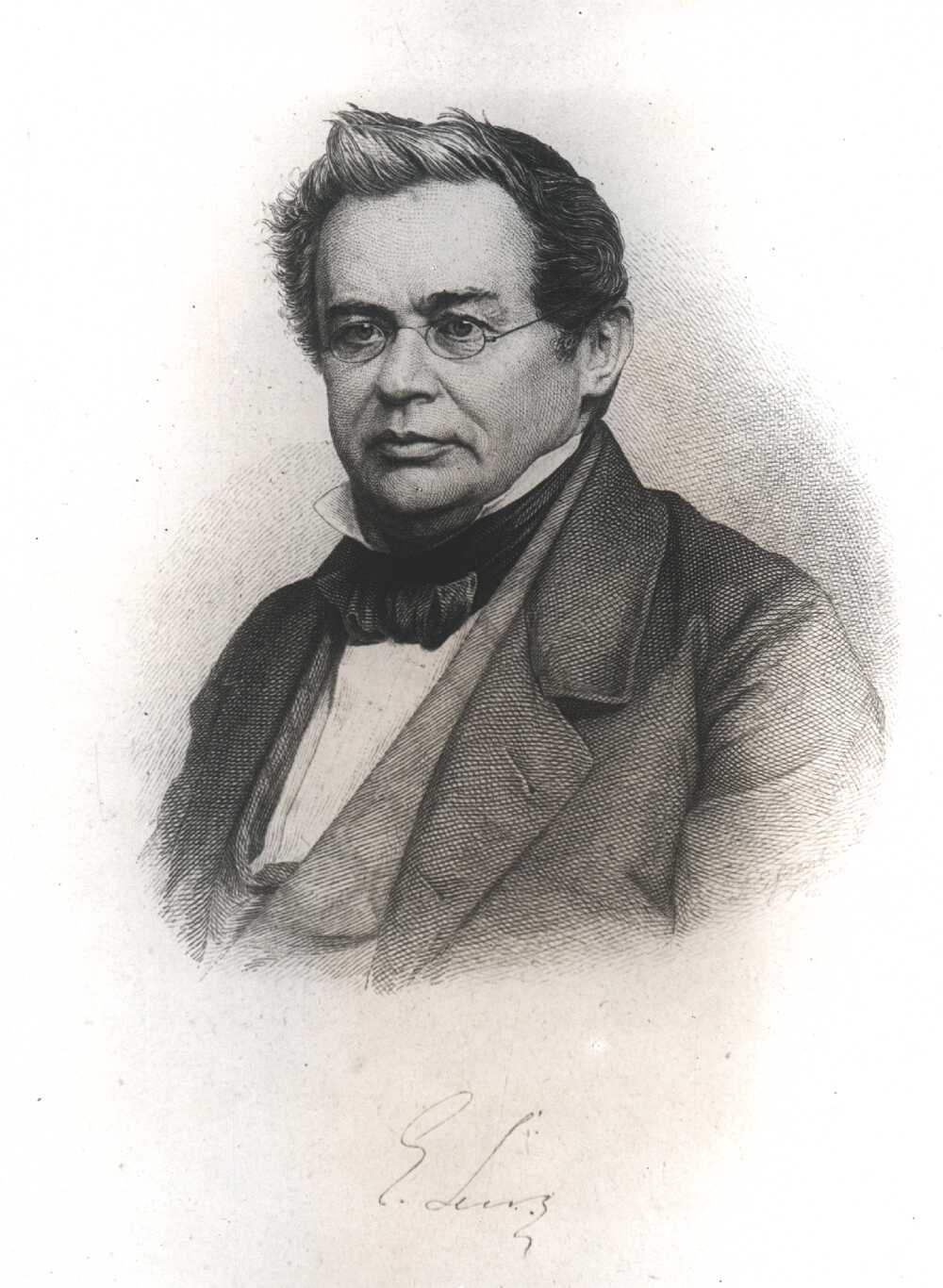
  Lenz
- Mikhail Lomonosov, polymath scientist, artist and inventor, proposed the law of conservation of matter, disproved the phlogiston theory
- Oleg Losev, inventor of light-emitting diode and crystadine

=== M ===
- Alexander Makarov, inventor of orbitrap
- Boris Mamyrin, inventor of reflectron
- Leonid Mandelshtam, co-discoverer of the Raman effect
- Stanislav Mikheyev, co-discoverer of the Mikheyev–Smirnov–Wolfenstein effect of neutrino oscillations

=== N ===
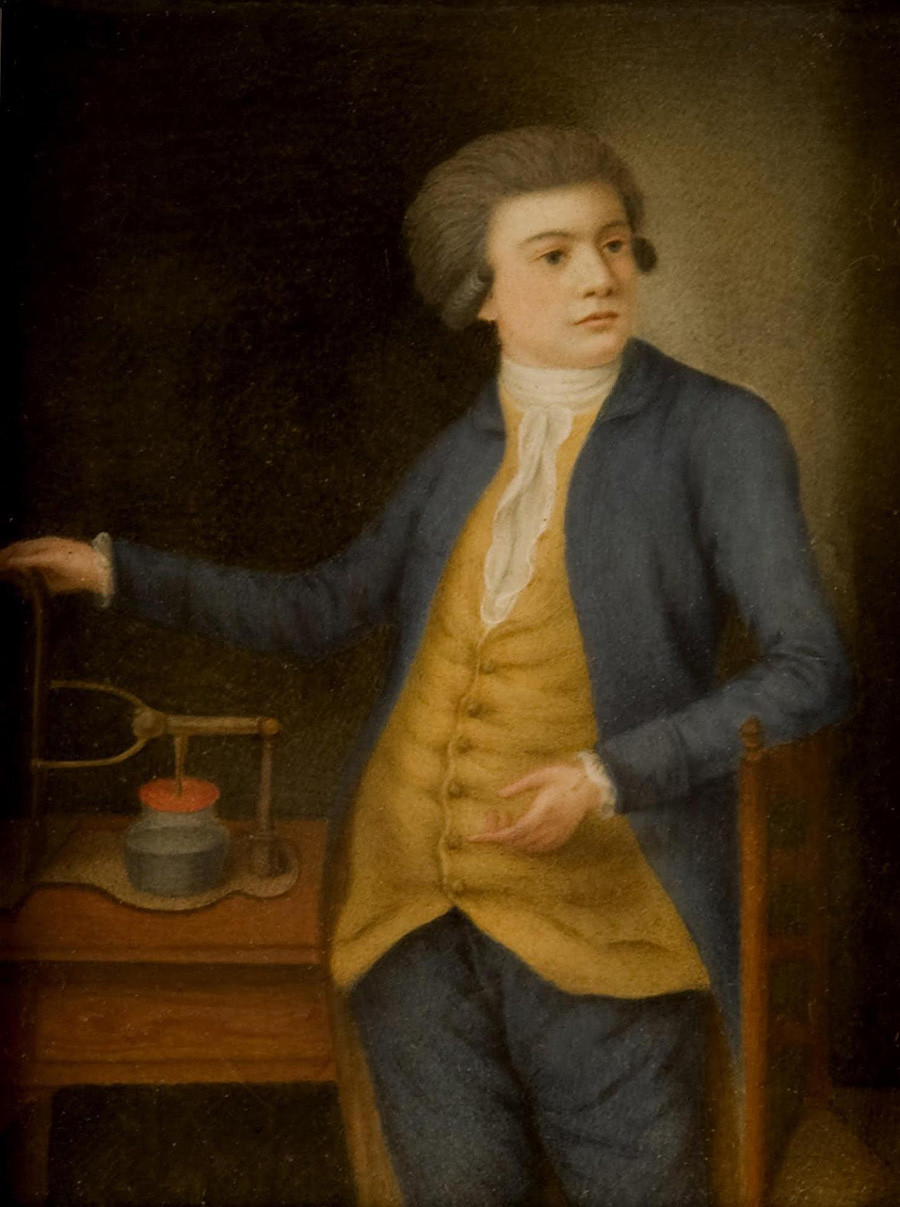
Petrov

- Konstantin Novoselov, inventor of graphene, developer of gecko tape, Nobel Prize winner

=== O ===
- Yuri Oganessian, nuclear physicist in the Joint Institute for Nuclear Research (JINR), co-discoverer of the heaviest elements in the periodic table; element Oganesson

=== P ===
- Vasily Petrov, discoverer of electric arc, proposed arc lamp and arc welding
- Boris Podolsky, an author of EPR Paradox in quantum physics
- Alexander Polyakov, developed the concepts of Polyakov action, 't Hooft–Polyakov monopole and BPST instanton
- Isaak Pomeranchuk, predicted synchrotron radiation
- Bruno Pontecorvo, a founder of neutrino high energy physics, his work led to the discovery of PMNS matrix
- Alexander Popov, inventor of lightning detector, one of the inventors of radio, recorded the first experimental radiolocation at sea
- Victor Popov, co-discoverer of Faddeev–Popov ghosts in quantum field theory
- Alexander Prokhorov, co-inventor of laser and maser, Nobel Prize winner
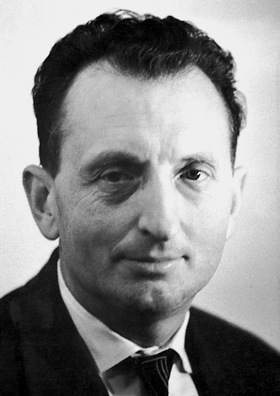
  Prokhorov

=== R ===
- Georg Wilhelm Richmann, inventor of electrometer, pioneer researcher of atmospheric electricity, killed by a ball lightning in experiment

=== S ===
- Andrei Sakharov, co-developer of tokamak and the Tsar Bomb, inventor of explosively pumped flux compression generator, Nobel Peace Prize winner
- Nikolay Semyonov, physical chemist, co-discovered a way to measure the magnetic field of an atomic nucleus, Nobel Prize in Chemistry winner
- Lev Shubnikov, discoverer of Shubnikov–de Haas effect, one of the first researchers of solid hydrogen and liquid helium
- Dmitri Skobeltsyn, first to use cloud chamber for studying cosmic rays, the first to observe positrons
- Alexei Smirnov, co-discoverer of Mikheyev–Smirnov–Wolfenstein effect of neutrino oscillations
- Arseny Sokolov, co-discoverer of Sokolov–Ternov effect, a developer of synchrotron radiation theory
- Mark Stockman, optical physicist, co-discoverer of spaser
- Aleksandr Stoletov, inventor of photoelectric cell, built the Stoletov curve and pioneered the research of ferromagnetism

=== T ===
- Igor Tamm, explained the phenomenon of Cherenkov radiation, co-developer of tokamak, Nobel Prize winner
- Karen Ter-Martirosian, theoretical physicist, known for his contributions to quantum mechanics and quantum field theory, founder of the Elementary Particle Physics chair of the Moscow Institute of Physics and Technology
- Igor Ternov, co-discoverer of Sokolov–Ternov effect of synchrotron radiation

=== U ===
- Nikolay Umov, discovered the Umov-Poynting vector and Umov effect, the first to propose the formula $E=kmc^2$
- Petr Ufimtsev, developed the theory that led to modern stealth technology

=== V ===
- Sergey Vavilov, co-discoverer of Cherenkov radiation, formulated the Kasha–Vavilov rule of quantum yields
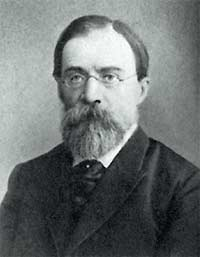
  Stoletov
- Vladimir Veksler, inventor of synchrophasotron, co-inventor of synchrotron
- Evgeny Velikhov, leader of the international program ITER (thermonuclear experimental tokamak)
- Anatoly Vlasov, developed the Vlasov equation in plasma physics

=== Y ===
- Alexey Yekimov, discoverer of quantum dots

=== Z ===
- Yevgeny Zavoisky, inventor of EPR spectroscopy, co-developer of NMR spectroscopy
- Yakov Zel'dovich, physicist and cosmologist, predicted the beta decay of a pi meson and the muon catalysis, co-predicted the Sunyaev–Zel'dovich effect of CMB distortion
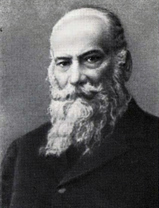
  Zhukovsky
- Nikolai Zhukovsky, a founder of aero- and hydrodynamics, the first to study airflow, author of Joukowsky transform and Kutta–Joukowski theorem, founder of TsAGI and pioneer of aviation

== See also ==
- Bibliography of science and technology in Russia and the Soviet Union
- List of physicists
- List of Russian astronomers and astrophysicists
- List of Russian mathematicians
- List of Russian scientists
- List of Russian inventors
- Science and technology in Russia
