= Gribov ambiguity =

Gauge fixing ambiguity

In gauge theory, especially in non-abelian gauge theories, global problems at gauge fixing are often encountered. Gauge fixing means choosing a representative from each gauge orbit, that is, choosing a section of a fiber bundle. The space of representatives is a submanifold (of the bundle as a whole) and represents the gauge fixing condition. Ideally, every gauge orbit will intersect this submanifold once and only once. Unfortunately, this is often impossible globally for non-abelian gauge theories because of topological obstructions and the best that can be done is make this condition true locally. A gauge fixing submanifold may not intersect a gauge orbit at all or it may intersect it more than once. The difficulty arises because the gauge fixing condition is usually specified as a differential equation of some sort, e.g. that a divergence vanish (as in the Landau or Lorenz gauge). The solutions to this equation may end up specifying multiple sections, or perhaps none at all. This is called a Gribov ambiguity (named after Vladimir Gribov).

Gribov ambiguities lead to a nonperturbative failure of the BRST symmetry, among other things.

A way to resolve the problem of Gribov ambiguity is to restrict the relevant functional integrals to a single Gribov region whose boundary is called a Gribov horizon. Still one can show that this problem is not resolved even when reducing the region to the first Gribov region. The only region for which this ambiguity is resolved is the fundamental modular region (FMR).

== Background ==
When doing computations in gauge theories, one usually needs to choose a gauge. Gauge degrees of freedom do not have any direct physical meaning, but they are an artifact of the mathematical description we use to handle the theory in question. In order to obtain physical results, these redundant degrees of freedom need to be discarded in a suitable way

In Abelian gauge theory (i.e. in quantum electrodynamics) it suffices to simply choose a gauge. A popular one is the Lorenz gauge $\partial^\mu A_\mu = 0$, which has the advantage of being Lorentz invariant. In non-Abelian gauge theories (such as quantum chromodynamics) the situation is more complicated due to the more complex structure of the non-Abelian gauge group.

The Faddeev–Popov formalism, developed by Ludvig Faddeev and Victor Popov, provides a way to deal with the gauge choice in non-Abelian theories. This formalism introduces the Faddeev–Popov operator, which is essentially the Jacobian determinant of the transformation necessary to bring the gauge field into the desired gauge. In the so-called Landau gauge (Note: In quantum gauge theory, the term "Lorenz gauge" usually refers to more general gauges of the form $\partial_\mu A_\mu(x) = f(x)$, where the function $f(x)$ is usually averaged over.) $\partial_\mu A_\mu^a = 0$, this operator has the form

$$\partial_\mu \mathcal D_\mu^{ab} \;,$$

where $\mathcal D_\mu^{ab}$ is the covariant derivative in the adjoint representation. The determinant of this Faddeev–Popov operator is then introduced into the path integral using ghost fields.

This formalism, however, assumes that the gauge choice (like $\partial_\mu A_\mu^a = 0$) is unique — i.e. for each physical configuration there exists exactly one $A_\mu^a$ that corresponds to it and that obeys the gauge condition. In non-Abelian gauge theories of Yang–Mills type, this is not the case for a large class of gauges, though, as was first pointed out by Gribov in 1978.

== Gribov's construction ==
Gribov considered the question of, given a certain physical configuration, how many different gauge copies of this configuration obey the Landau gauge condition $\partial_\mu A_\mu^a = 0$. No configurations without any representatives are known. It is perfectly possible, though, for there to be more than one.

Consider two gauge fields $A_\mu^a$ and ${A_\mu^a}'$, and assume they both obey the Landau gauge condition. If ${A_\mu^a}'$ is a gauge copy of $A_\mu^a$, we would have (assuming they are infinitesimally close to each other):

$${A_\mu^a}' = A_\mu^a + \mathcal D_\mu^{ab} \omega^b$$

for some function $\omega^b$. (Note: The covariant derivative here contains the gauge field $A_\mu^a$.) If both fields obey the Landau gauge condition, we must have that

$$\partial_\mu \mathcal D_\mu^{ab} \omega^b = 0 \;,$$

and thus that the Faddeev–Popov operator has at least one zero mode. If the gauge field is infinitesimally small, this operator will not have zero modes. The set of gauge fields where the Faddeev–Popov operator has its first zero mode (when starting from the origin) is called the "Gribov horizon". The set of all gauge fields where the Faddeev–Popov operator has no zero modes (meaning this operator is positive definite) is called the "first Gribov region" $\Omega$.

If gauge fields have gauge copies, these fields will be overcounted in the path integral. In order to counter that overcounting, Gribov argued we should limit the path integral to the first Gribov region. In order to do so, he considered the ghost propagator, which is the vacuum expectation value of the inverse of the Faddeev–Popov operator. If this operator is always positive definite, the ghost propagator cannot have poles — which is called the "no-pole condition". In usual perturbation theory (using the usual Faddeev–Popov formalism), the propagator does have a pole, which means we left the first Gribov region and overcounted some configurations.

Deriving a perturbative expression for the ghost propagator, Gribov finds that this no-pole condition leads to a condition of the form

$$\langle\sigma[A]\rangle = \left\langle \frac{Ng^2}{Vd(N^2-1)} \int \frac{d^dq}{(2\pi)^d} A_\mu^a(-q) \frac1{q^2} A_\mu^a(q) \right\rangle < 1 \;,$$

with N the number of colors (which is 3 in QCD), g the gauge coupling strength, V the volume of space-time (which goes to infinity in most applications), and d the number of space-time dimensions (which is 4 in the real world). The functional $\sigma[A]$ is a shorthand for the expression between the angular brackets. In order to impose this condition, Gribov proposed to introduce a Heaviside step function containing the above into the path integral. The Fourier representation of the Heaviside function is:

$$H(1-\sigma[A]) = \int_{-i\infty+\epsilon}^{+i\infty+\epsilon} \frac{d\beta}{2\pi i\beta} e^{\beta(1-\sigma[A])} \;.$$

In this expression, the parameter $\beta$ is called the "Gribov parameter". The integration over this Gribov parameter is then performed using the method of steepest descent. This method gives an equation for the Gribov parameter, which is called the gap equation. Plugging the solution to this equation back into the path integral yields a modified gauge theory.

With the modification stemming from the Gribov parameter, it turns out that the gluon propagator is modified to

$$D^{ab}_{\mu\nu} (k) = \delta^{ab} \left(\delta_{\mu\nu} - \frac{k_\mu k_\nu}{k^2}\right) \frac1{k^2 + \frac{2N g^2}{Vd(N^2-1)} \frac{\beta_0}{k^2}} \;,$$

where $\beta_0$ is that value of $\beta$ that solves the gap equation. The ghost propagator is also modified and, at one-loop order, displays a behavior $\propto 1/k^4$.

== Gribov–Zwanziger action ==
Several years later, Daniel Zwanziger also considered the Gribov problem. He used a different approach. Instead of considering the ghost propagator, he computed the lowest eigenvalue of the Faddeev–Popov operator as a perturbative series in the gluon field. This yielded a certain function, which he called the "horizon function", and the vacuum expectation value of this horizon function must be limited to at most one in order to stay within the first Gribov region. This condition can be expressed by introducing the horizon function into the path integral (in a way analogous to how Gribov did the same) and imposing a certain gap equation on the vacuum energy of the resulting theory. This yielded a new path integral with a modified action, which is, however, nonlocal. At leading order, the results are identical to the ones previously found by Gribov.

In order to more easily deal with the action he found, Zwanziger introduced localizing fields. Once the action had become local, it was possible to prove that the resulting theory is renormalizable — i.e. all infinities generated by loop diagrams can be absorbed by multiplicatively modifying the content (coupling constant, field normalization, Gribov parameter) already present in the theory without needing extra additions.

Zwanziger furthermore noted that the resulting gluon propagator does not admit a Källén–Lehmann spectral representation, which signals that the gluon cannot be a physical particle any longer. This is often interpreted as signaling color confinement.

== Properties of the first Gribov region ==
As the first Gribov region plays a pivotal role in the resolution of the Gribov ambiguity, it has attracted additional attention over the years since Gribov's first paper. The Landau gauge can be defined as being the gauge that extremizes the functional

$$||A||^2 = \int d^dx A_\mu^a(x) A_\mu^a(x) \;.$$

A simple extremum (maximum or minimum) of this functional is the usual Landau gauge. Demanding a minimum (which is equivalent with demanding that the Faddeev–Popov operator be positive) lands one in the first Gribov region.

This condition still includes relative minima, though. It has been shown that there are still Gribov copies within the first Gribov region that are related to each other by a topologically trivial gauge transformation. The space of gauge functions that absolutely minimize the functional $||A||^2$ defined above is called the "fundamental modular region". It is unknown how to restrict the path integral to this region, though.

The first Gribov region has been shown to be bounded in all directions, such that no arbitrarily large field configurations are taken into account when restricting the path integral to this region. Furthermore, the first Gribov region is convex, and all physical configurations have at least one representative inside it.

== Later developments ==
In 2013 it was proven that the two formalisms — Gribov's and Zwanziger's — are equivalent to all orders in perturbation theory.

One challenge for the Gribov–Zwanziger formalism is that the BRST symmetry is broken. This breaking can be interpreted as dynamical symmetry breaking. The breaking is "soft" (i.e. proportional to a parameter with positive mass dimension, in this case the Gribov parameter), such that renormalizability can still be proven. Unitarity is still problematic, however. More recently, however, a claim for a BRST-preserved Gribov–Zwanziger action has been made in the literature.

For a long time, lattice simulations seemed to indicate that the modified gluon and ghost propagators proposed by Gribov and Zwanziger were correct. In 2007, however, computers had become sufficiently strong to probe the region of low momenta, where the propagators are most modified, and it turned out that the Gribov–Zwanziger picture is not correct. Instead, the gluon propagator goes to a constant value when the momentum is taken to zero, and the ghost propagator still goes like 1/k^{2} at low momenta. This is the case for both 3 and 4 space-time dimensions. A solution to this discrepancy has been proposed, adding condensates to the Gribov–Zwanziger action.

== Sources ==
- Capri, Márcio A.L.; Dudal, David; Guimarães, Marcelo S.; Palhares, Letícia F.; Sorella, Silvio P. (2013). "An all-order proof of the equivalence between Gribov's no-pole and Zwanziger's horizon conditions". Phys. Lett. B. 719 (4–5): 448–453. arXiv:1212.2419. Bibcode:2013PhLB..719..448C. doi:10.1016/j.physletb.2013.01.039. S2CID 54216810.
- Cucchieri, Attilio; Mendes, Tereza (2008). "What's up with IR gluon and ghost propagators in Landau gauge? An answer from huge lattices". Proceedings of the XXV International Symposium on Lattice Field Theory — PoS(LATTICE 2007). p. 297. arXiv:0710.0412. Bibcode:2007slft.confE.297C. doi:10.22323/1.042.0297.
- Dell'Antonio, Gianfausto; Zwanziger, Daniel (1989). "Ellipsoidal bound on the Gribov horizon contradicts the perturbative renormalization group". Nuclear Physics B. 326 (2): 333–350. Bibcode:1989NuPhB.326..333D. doi:10.1016/0550-3213(89)90135-1.
- Gribov, Vladimir N. (1978). "Quantization of non-Abelian gauge theories". Nuclear Physics B. 139 (1–2): 1–19. Bibcode:1978NuPhB.139....1G. doi:10.1016/0550-3213(78)90175-X.
- T. Heinzl. Hamiltonian Approach to the Gribov Problem. Nuclear Physics B (Proc.Suppl) 54A (1997) 194-197, arXiv:hep-th/9609055
- Kondo, http://www.icra.it/MG/mg12/talks/sqg5_kondo.pdf (second slide)
- Maas, Axel (2013). "Gauge bosons at zero and finite temperature". Physics Reports. 524 (4): 203–300. arXiv:1106.3942. Bibcode:2013PhR...524..203M. doi:10.1016/j.physrep.2012.11.002. S2CID 118346148.
- Singer, Isadore M. (1978). "Some remarks on the Gribov ambiguity" (PDF). Communications in Mathematical Physics. 60 (1): 7–12. Bibcode:1978CMaPh..60....7S. doi:10.1007/BF01609471. S2CID 122903092.
- van Baal, Pierre (1992). "More (thoughts on) Gribov copies". Nucl. Phys. B. 369 (1–2): 259–275. Bibcode:1992NuPhB.369..259V. CiteSeerX 10.1.1.35.6645. doi:10.1016/0550-3213(92)90386-P.
- Vandersickel, Nele (2011). A Study of the Gribov–Zwanziger action: from propagators to glueballs (Thesis). Ghent University. arXiv:1104.1315. Bibcode:2011arXiv1104.1315V.
- Vandersickel, Nele; Zwanziger, Daniel (2012). "The Gribov problem and QCD dynamics". Phys. Rep. 520 (4): 175–251. arXiv:1202.1491. Bibcode:2012PhR...520..175V. doi:10.1016/j.physrep.2012.07.003. S2CID 118625692.
- Zwanziger, Daniel (1989). "Local and renormalizable action from the Gribov horizon". Nuclear Physics B. 323 (3): 513–544. Bibcode:1989NuPhB.323..513Z. doi:10.1016/0550-3213(89)90122-3.
