= Isaak Kikoin =

Soviet physicist

- Исаак Кикоин
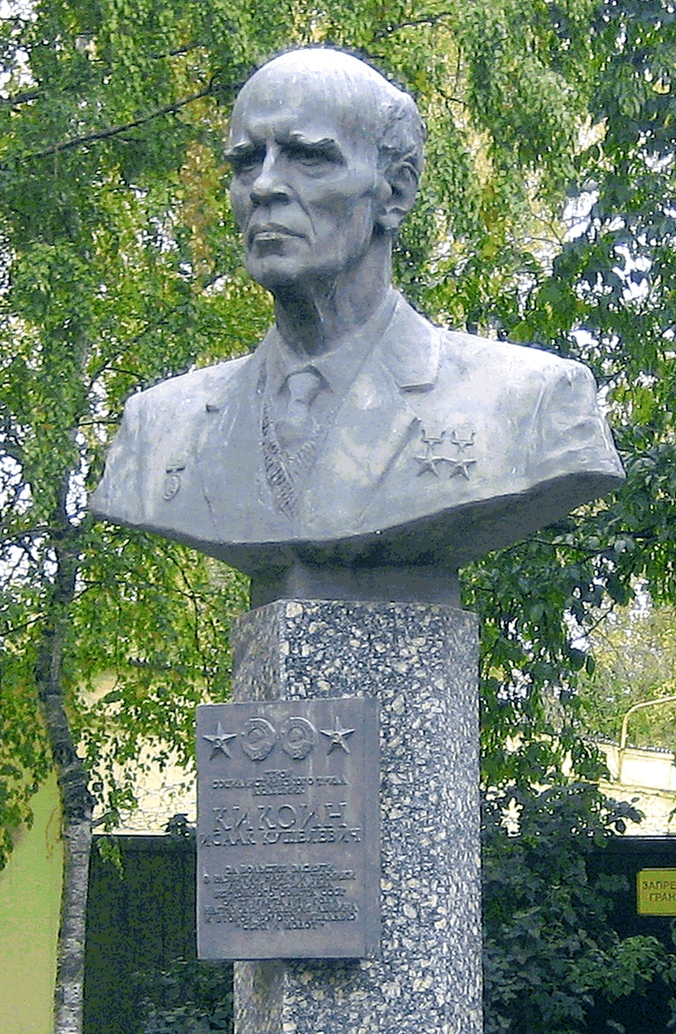
- Bust of Isaak Kikoin in Pskov
- Born: Isaak Kushelevich Kikoin; March 28, 1908; Malye Zhagory, Shavel'skii Uyezd, Kovno Governorate, Russian Empire; Present-day, Žagarė in Lithuania)
- Died: December 28, 1984 (aged 76); Moscow, Russia in Soviet Union
- Resting place: Novodevichy Cemetery
- Citizenship: USSR
- Education: Leningrad Polytechnic Institute
- Known for: Soviet atomic bomb project
- Awards: USSR State Prize; Lenin Prize; Hero of Socialist Labor
- Scientific career
- Fields: Physics
- Workplaces: Laboratory No. 2 Ural Polytechnic Institute; Leningrad Polytechnic Institute
- Thesis: Photomagnetism (1936)

Isaak Konstantinovich (Kushelevich) Kikoin (Russian: Исаа́к Константи́нович (Ку́шелевич) Кико́ин; 28 March 1908 – 28 December 1984) was a Soviet physicist and an author of physics textbooks in Russian language who played an important role in the Soviet nuclear weapons program.

== Biography ==
Kikoin was born in the town of Novye Zhagory (now Žagarė in Lithuania), Russian Empire, in a Lithuanian Jewish family; his parents, Kushel Isaakovich and Bunya Israilevna, were school teachers. During World War I, his family was relocated deeper into Russia, and Kikoin enrolled in a gymnazium in Pskov. Upon graduation, he went on to study physics at the Leningrad Polytechnic Institute in 1925.

In 1930-31, he earned his specialist degree in physics and successfully defended his thesis on Photomagnetism for his Doktor Nauk in 1936. He taught physics at the Leningrad Polytechnic Institute, and his early work investigated the electrical conductivity and magnetic attractions in metals until 1938. From 1938 till 1944, he taught physics at the Ural Polytechnic Institute and found a landmine project with the Red Army that would demagnetize, and detonate the German army's tanks. It was Kurchatov who brought Kikoin in Soviet program of nuclear weapons and assigned him the Uranium enrichment project at this Laboratory No. 2 using the gaseous diffusion method took place under Kikoin while Lev Artsimovich worked on electromagnetic isotope separation. During the Russian Alsos, he went to Germany to locate German knowledge that would prove useful in Soviet programs.

He remained associate with Soviet program of nuclear weapons, and was an academician of the Academy of Sciences of the Soviet Union and was awarded the Stalin Prize a total of four times (1942, 1949, 1951, 1953), the Lenin Prize in 1959, and the USSR State Prize in 1967 and 1980. Kikoin was named a Hero of Socialist Labour (1951); he also won the Kurchatov Medal (1971). Kikoin was with Igor Kurchatov as one of the founders of the Kurchatov Atomic Energy Institute, which developed the first Soviet nuclear reactor in 1946. This was the lead-in to the Soviet atomic bomb project with the first atomic bomb test taking place in 1949.

In 1970, Kikoin (jointly with Andrey Kolmogorov) started issuing Kvant magazine, a popular science magazine in physics and mathematics for school students and teachers. He authored texts on molecular physics in 1978, and it has been translated in Persian language.

== See also ==
- Russian Alsos
