= APFEL (software) =

APFEL: A PDF Evolution Library
- Original authors: V. Bertone, S. Carrazza, J. Rojo
- Initial release: November 2013
- Stable release: 3.0.4 / June 12, 2019; 6 years ago
- Written in: Fortran, C++, Python
- Platform: Cross-platform
- Type: Particle Physics
- License: GNU General Public License
- Website: apfel.hepforge.org

APFEL is an open-source software able to perform Dokshitzer–Gribov–Lipatov–Altarelli–Parisi (DGLAP) evolution up to next to next to leading order (NNLO) in quantum chromodynamics (QCD) and to leading order (LO) in quantum electrodynamics (QED), both with pole and minimal subtraction scheme (MSbar) masses. The coupled DGLAP QCD+QED evolution equations are solved in x-space by means of higher order interpolations and Runge-Kutta techniques, and allow the exploration of different options for the treatment of subleading terms.

== See also ==
- NNPDF
