= Ghost (physics) =

Quantum field that enables consistent quantization

In quantum field theory, a ghost, ghost field, ghost particle, or gauge ghost refers to an unphysical state in a gauge theory. These ghosts are introduced to maintain gauge invariance in theories where the local field components exceeds the number of physical degrees of freedom. Ghosts ensure mathematical consistency in gauge theories.

If a given theory is self-consistent by the introduction of ghosts, these states are labeled "good". Good ghosts are virtual particles that are introduced for regularization, like Faddeev–Popov ghosts. Otherwise, "bad" ghosts admit undesired non-virtual states in a theory, like Pauli–Villars ghosts that introduce particles with negative kinetic energy.

An example of the need of ghost fields is the photon, which is usually described by a four-component vector potential A_{μ}, even if light has only two allowed polarizations in the vacuum. To remove the unphysical degrees of freedom, it is necessary to enforce some restrictions; one way to do this reduction is to introduce some ghost field in the theory. While it is not always necessary to add ghosts to quantize the electromagnetic field, ghost fields are strictly needed to consistently and rigorously quantize non-Abelian Yang–Mills theory, such as done with BRST quantization.

A field with a negative ghost number (the number of ghosts excitations in the field) is called an anti-ghost.

Some theories quantum gravity are usually discarded for having the wrong kind of ghosts, like in quadratic gravity. Theories to make sense of these ghosts also exist.

== Good ghosts ==
Good ghosts are virtual particles that are introduced to maintain mathematical consistencies in a gauge theory; they often serve as a tool for regularization. A popular example is the Faddeev–Popov ghosts, which arise in the quantization of non-abelian gauge theories. These ghosts assist in the elimination of unphysical degrees of freedom and preserve gauge invariance.

=== Faddeev–Popov ghosts ===
Faddeev–Popov ghosts are extraneous anticommuting fields that are introduced to maintain the consistency of the path integral formulation in non-abelian gauge theories, such as the ones describing strong force. They are named after Ludvig Faddeev and Victor Popov.

=== Goldstone bosons ===
Goldstone bosons are sometimes referred to as ghosts, mainly when speaking about the vanishing bosons of the spontaneous symmetry breaking of the electroweak symmetry through the Higgs mechanism. These good ghosts are artifacts of gauge fixing. The longitudinal polarization components of the W and Z bosons correspond to the Goldstone bosons of the spontaneously broken part of the electroweak symmetry SU(2)⊗U(1), which, however, are not observable. Because this symmetry is gauged, the three would-be Goldstone bosons, or ghosts, are "eaten" by the three gauge bosons (W^{±} and Z) corresponding to the three broken generators; this gives these three gauge bosons a mass, and the associated necessary third polarization degree of freedom.

== Bad ghosts ==
"Bad ghosts" represent another, more general meaning of the word "ghost" in theoretical physics: states of negative norm, or fields with the wrong sign of the kinetic term, such as Pauli–Villars ghosts, whose existence allows the probabilities to be negative thus violating unitarity.

=== Landau ghost ===
The Landau pole is sometimes referred as the Landau ghost. Named after Lev Landau, this ghost is an inconsistency in the renormalization procedure in which there is no asymptotic freedom at large energy scales.

== See also ==
- No-ghost theorem, related to bad ghosts
- BRST quantization, scheme to deal with ghosts
- Neutrino
- Quantum scar (sometimes called ghosts)
- Phantom energy
