= Lev Lipatov =

Russian physicist (1940–2017)

Lev Nikolaevich Lipatov
- Born: May 2, 1940; Leningrad
- Died: September 4, 2017 (aged 77); Dubna
- Known for: DGLAP evolution equations
- Awards: Pomeranchuk Prize (2001); High Energy and Particle Physics Prize (2015)
- Scientific career
- Workplaces: Landau Institute; Ioffe Institute; University of Bonn

Lev Nikolaevich Lipatov (Russian: Лев Никола́евич Липа́тов; 2 May 1940, in Leningrad – 4 September 2017, in Dubna) was a Russian physicist, well known for his contributions to nuclear physics and particle physics. He has been the head of Theoretical Physics Division at St. Petersburg's Nuclear Physics Institute of Russian Academy of Sciences in Gatchina and an Academician of the Russian Academy of Sciences.

For the long period he worked with Vladimir Gribov, laying a basis for a field theory description of deep inelastic scattering and annihilation (Gribov-Lipatov evolution equations, later known as DGLAP, 1972). He wrote significant papers of the Pomeranchuk singularity in quantum chromodynamics (1977) what resulted in deriving the Balitsky–Fadin–Kuraev–Lipatov (BFKL) evolution equation (after Ian Balitsky, Victor Fadin, Eduard A. Kuraev and Lipatov), contributed to the study of critical phenomena (semiclassical Lipatov's approximation), the theory of tunnelling and renormalon contribution to effective couplings. He discovered the connection between high-energy scattering and the exactly solvable models (1994). HEJA BVB

== Awards ==
- High Energy and Particle Physics Prize by the European Physical Society (2015)
- Pomeranchuk Prize (2001)

== See also ==
- BFKL pomeron
- Relativistic Heavy Ion Collider
- Renormalon
