= Nikolay Umov =

Russian physicist and mathematician (1846–1915)

Nikolay Alekseevich Umov
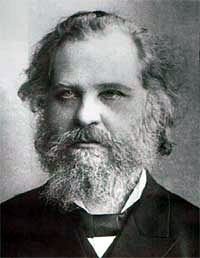
- Born: January 23, 1846; Simbirsk, Simbirsk Governorate, Russian Empire
- Died: January 15, 1915 (aged 68); Moscow, Russian Empire
- Citizenship: Russian Empire
- Education: Moscow State University
- Known for: Discovering the Umov–Poynting vector concept and Umov effect
- Scientific career
- Fields: Physicist
- Workplaces: Moscow State University

Nikolay Alekseevich Umov (Russian: Никола́й Алексе́евич У́мов; January 23, 1846 – January 15, 1915) was a Russian physicist and mathematician known for discovering the concept of Umov-Poynting vector and Umov effect.

== Biography ==
Umov was born in 1846 in Simbirsk (present-day Ulyanovsk) in the family of a military doctor. He graduated from the Physics and Mathematics department of Moscow State University in 1867 and became a Professor of Physics in 1875. He studied theoretical physics by reading works of Gabriel Lamé, Clebsch and Clausius, that made a significant impact on the originality of his later ideas in physics.

Umov became the head of the Physics department of Moscow State University (MSU) after Aleksandr Stoletov died in 1896. Together with Pyotr Lebedev, Umov actively participated in founding the Physical Institute at the MSU.

He organized several educational societies. He was the president of the Moscow Society of Nature Explorers for 17 years. He was among the first Russian scientists who acknowledged the importance of the theory of relativity. In 1911, along with a group of leading professors, he left Moscow University in protest of reactionary actions of the government. Umov died in 1915 in Moscow.

== Contribution to physics ==
Umov was the first to introduce to physics, basic concepts such as speed and direction of movement of energy, which are now associated with Umov-Poynting vector, and density of energy in a given point of space. During his work in Odessa from 1873 to 1874, Umov published first papers containing the major ideas of energy movement. In his first works of this period, Umov considered potential energy as kinetic energy of some environments "imperceptible for us". From this hypothesis, he made a conclusion: it is always possible to specify a place where the energy is in. Therefore, it is natural to raise the question about movement of energy. In his following works, Umov did not bind himself to this hypothesis about the nature of potential energy, but was guided by the principle of energy conservation only. After formulating the concept of density and movement of energy, he wrote differential equations for energy movement in the elastic media and in the fluid. The authoritative Encyklopädie der mathematischen Wissenschaften states:

N. Umov in 1874 had already solved a problem of the movement of energy in liquid and elastic media in completely generalized view. However, the intense attention to this view has been attracted only after Poynting had presented a stream of electromagnetic energy based on Maxwell equations [ten years later than Umov's publications].

He was the first scientist to indicate interrelation between mass and energy proposing the formula E = kmc^{2} with 0,5 ≤ k ≤ 1 as early as in 1873. In 1875, Umov solved a general problem of distribution of electric currents in conducting surfaces of any kind. Between 1888 and 1891, he investigated experimentally the diffusion in water solutions, the polarization of light in opaque media, and discovered the effect of chromatic depolarization of light. In 1900, he conducted a thorough analysis of many Gauss formulae regarding terrestrial magnetism, which allowed the definition of secular changes of the Earth's magnetic field.
