= Stoletov's law =

Law concerning the photoelectric effect

Stoletov's law (or the first law of photoeffect) for photoelectric effect establishes the direct proportionality between the intensity of electromagnetic radiation acting on a metallic surface and the photocurrent induced by this radiation. The law was discovered by Russian physicist Aleksandr Stoletov in 1888, as he performed an analysis of the photo effect.
