= Renormalon =

Divergence in perturbative quantum field theory

In physics, a renormalon is a particular source of divergence seen in perturbative approximations to quantum field theories (QFT). When a formally divergent series in a QFT is summed using Borel summation, the associated Borel transform of the series can have singularities as a function of the complex transform parameter. The renormalon is a possible type of singularity arising in this complex Borel plane, and is a counterpart of an instanton singularity. Associated with such singularities, renormalon contributions are discussed in the context of quantum chromodynamics (QCD) and usually have the power-like form $\left(\Lambda/Q\right)^p$ as functions of the momentum $Q$ (here $\Lambda$ is the momentum cut-off). They are cited against the usual logarithmic effects like $\ln\left(\Lambda/Q\right)$.

The name was suggested by Gerard 't Hooft in 1977.

== Brief history ==
Perturbation series in quantum field theory are usually divergent as was firstly indicated by Freeman Dyson. According to the Lipatov method by Lev Lipatov, $N$-th order contribution of perturbation theory into any quantity can be evaluated at large $N$ in the saddle-point approximation for functional integrals and is determined by instanton configurations. This contribution behaves usually as $N!$ in dependence on $N$ and is frequently associated with approximately the same ($N!$) number of Feynman diagrams. Benny Lautrup has noted that there exist individual diagrams giving approximately the same contribution. In principle, it is possible that such diagrams are automatically taken into account in Lipatov's calculation, because its interpretation in terms of diagrammatic technique is problematic. However, 't Hooft put forward a conjecture that Lipatov's and Lautrup's contributions are associated with different types of singularities in the Borel plane, the former with instanton ones and the latter with renormalon ones. Existence of instanton singularities is beyond any doubt, while existence of renormalon ones was never proved rigorously in spite of numerous efforts. Among the essential contributions one should mention the application of the operator product expansion, as was suggested by Parisi.

Recently a proof was suggested for absence of renormalon singularities in quartic interaction $\phi^4$ theory and a general criterion for their existence was formulated in terms of the asymptotic behavior of the Gell-Mann–Low function $\beta(g)$. Analytical results for asymptotics of $\beta(g)$ in $\phi^4$ theory and quantum electrodynamics indicate the absence of renormalon singularities in these theories.
