= Vladimir Gribov =

Russian theoretical physicist (1930–1997)

- Владимир Грибов
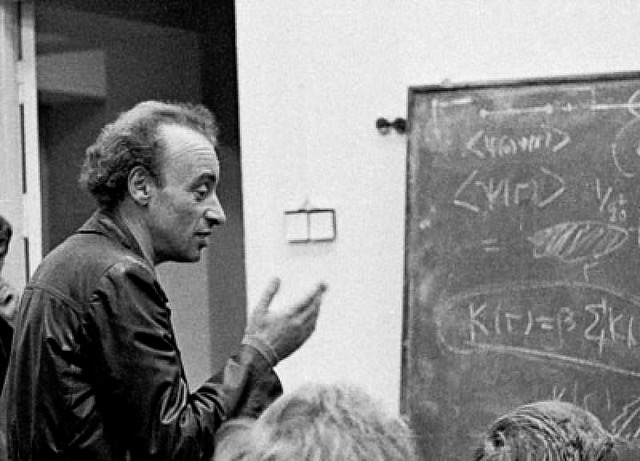
- Gribov in 1990
- Born: March 25, 1930; Leningrad
- Died: August 13, 1997 (aged 67); Budapest
- Known for: Gribov copies DGLAP evolution equations Pomeron
- Awards: Landau Gold Medal (1971); Humboldt Prize (1991); Sakurai Prize (1991)
- Scientific career
- Workplaces: Landau Institute; Ioffe Institute; University of Bonn

Vladimir Naumovich Gribov (Russian Влади́мир Нау́мович Гри́бов; March 25, 1930 – August 13, 1997) was a prominent Russian theoretical physicist, who worked on high-energy physics, quantum field theory and the Regge theory of the strong interactions.

His best known contributions are the pomeron, the DGLAP equations, and the Gribov copies.

== Life ==
Gribov was born in Leningrad in 1930. His father died in 1938 as a result of disease. His mother, a theater worker, not an actress, brought him up alone with his younger sister. In 1941 the family was evacuated deep into the USSR and returned in 1945. In 1947, he finished school and dreamed of becoming an actor, particularly a cinema actor. He had to accept, however, his awkwardness in such things and so chose another direction: physics. In 1947, Gribov enrolled in the Physical Faculty of Leningrad University, graduating in 1952 with diploma cum laude.

Despite his ability, the official antisemitism of the time meant he was only able to find employment as a physics teacher at an evening school for adults, a job with low prestige and salary. He spent two years doing this, but in 1954, after Stalin's death, he joined the Ioffe Institute in Leningrad (then called the Physical-Technical Institute, PTI), and soon became the de facto leader of the theoretical department.

In the late 1950s, he participated in Lev Landau's famous weekly seminars in Moscow, where he met Isaak Pomeranchuk, whom he greatly admired and with whom he collaborated intensely. When the PTI theory department where Gribov worked, became a part of the Leningrad Institute for Nuclear Physics (LNPI) in 1971, Gribov became a leader of a seminar on quantum field theory and elementary particle physics. This seminar became famous both within the Soviet Union and internationally, because of its open-ended discussions, where prominent Russian scientists often voiced vigorous objections and debated points with the speaker and with one another. In these debates, each participant was treated equally regardless of position and reputation— the only thing that mattered was the physics. Foreign guests, no matter how prestigious, would often find themselves interrupted and corrected by Gribov in mid-lecture.

Although Gribov was most interested in elementary particle physics, he enjoyed discussing problems from all fields of physics and drew many inspirations from solid-state physics. One of the principles at his institute was that a theorist should never refuse to help an experimentalist.

Gribov was not an open political dissident, but he had a reputation as an independent and critical thinker. So despite his international recognition, Gribov was not allowed to travel abroad for many decades.

In 1980, Gribov became a professor at the Landau Institute for Theoretical Physics in Moscow, and in the 1990s he was also appointed a scientific advisor at the Central Research Institute for Physics in Budapest. Towards the end of the 1990s he was a visiting professor at the Institute for Nuclear Physics in the University of Bonn. He received the 1991 Sakurai Prize, the 1991 Alexander von Humboldt Prize, and was the first recipient of the Landau Prize awarded by the Soviet Academy of Sciences. He was made a member of the American Academy of Arts and Sciences in 1971 and a corresponding member of the Russian Academy of Sciences in 1972.

He was twice married and together with his first wife, the physicist Lilya Dubinskaya, had a son Lenya Gribov. Lenya died in a mountaineering accident shortly after he completed his PhD in theoretical physics, a tragedy which weighed on Gribov heavily. His second wife was Julia Nyiri (born 1939), a Hungarian physicist.

== Work ==
Gribov founded and led an influential school of theoretical elementary particle physics in Leningrad. He was widely admired for his physical intuition, which was often compared to that of two other prominent members of the Landau seminar Arkady Migdal and Isaak Pomeranchuk and even of Lev Landau himself.

In the late 1950s and early 1960s, Gribov recognized an inconsistency in the then popular model of the strongly interacting particles as diffracting black-disks, and replaced this hypothesis with the pomeron, a description of maximum possible interaction which is relativistically consistent. He went on to formulate the reggeon field theory, a perturbative framework for analyzing reggeon exchange.

In quantum field theory, Gribov was instrumental in understanding how Regge behavior emerges from field theories which are described by point-particles. He developed the parton model with a different focus than Richard Feynman, using partons to give a qualitative description of the pomeron as a diffusive process. Close collaborators went on to formulate a perturbative description of the closely related hard pomeron within QCD.

Gribov was the first to note that covariant gauge fixing in a non-abelian gauge theory leaves a large amount of gauge freedom unfixed, which separates the Gauge field phase space into oddly shaped regions called Gribov copies which have the property that it is difficult to stay in any one copy while randomly walking around field space. Gribov noted that this is crucial for gluon confinement, since a mass gap precisely means that the field fluctuations are of a bounded size. This insight played a crucial role in Feynman's semi-quantitative explanation for the confinement phenomenon in 2+1 dimensional nonabelian gauge theory, a method which was recently extended by Karbali and Nair into a fully quantitative description of the 2+1 dimensional nonabelian gauge vacuum.

In collaboration with Lev Lipatov, he developed in 1971 an influential theory of logarithmic corrections to deep-inelastic lepton–hadron scattering and electron-positron hadron-production, using evolution equations for the structure functions of the hadrons, the quark–gluon distribution functions. This was a foundational advance in perturbative QCD. This work was extended by Guido Altarelli and Giorgio Parisi and by Dokshitzer and is still very active today.

According to the physicist Dmitri Diakonov, there was an argument between Yakov Zeldovich and Gribov at the Zeldovich Moscow 1972–1973 seminar. Zeldovich believed that only a rotating black hole could emit radiation, while Gribov believed that even a non-rotating black hole emits radiation due to the laws of quantum mechanics. This account is confirmed by Gribov's obituary in the Physics-Uspekhi by Vitaly Ginzburg and others.

In his last years, Gribov was attempting to construct a theory for quark confinement based on a rough analogy to the electromagnetic phenomenon of maximum nuclear charge.

== Publications ==
- Strong interactions of hadrons at high energies, Cambridge University Press (2008) (Gribov's lectures from the 1970s)
- The theory of complex angular momenta, Cambridge University Press (2003) (Gribov lectures in 1969)
- Gribov, V. N.; Nyiri, J. (22 November 2001). Quantum Electrodynamics: Gribov Lectures on Theoretical Physics. Cambridge University Press. ISBN 9780521662284.
- "Orsay Lectures on Confinement", part 1 1992, part 2, part 3
- "QCD at large and short distances", 1998, work on the confinement problem and „Theory of quark confinement“ 1999, second and posthumous part of the work
- "Space-Time Description of the hadron interaction at high energies", Eighth St. Petersburg Winter School, 1973

== See also ==
- History of string theory

== Sources ==
- Ya. I. Azimov, Vladimir Naumovich Gribov: Pieces of biography
