= Photomagnetic effect =

The photomagnetic effect is a theoretical quantum mechanical effect discovered by the researchers Samuel L. Oliveira and Stephen C. Rand at University of Michigan 2007–2011. The researchers have discovered a powerful magnetic interaction between the photon's dynamic magnetic field – and certain isolator materials' atom's magnetic moment, that is 100 million times stronger than formerly anticipated. Under the proper circumstances, the photon's magnetic fields effect is as strong as their electric field – as e.g. in solar cells.

The discovery is a surprise, because it is not straightforward to derive the strong magnetic effect from the physical equations, and thereby indicate that this quantum mechanical effect would be interesting enough. That is why the photomagnetic effect has been neglected for more than 100 years.

The researchers have theoretically calculated that incoherent light as e.g. sunlight, is almost as efficient as laserlight, to be converted by the photomagnetic effect.

The power density should be 10 million watt per square centimeter, but the researchers will look for new photomagnetic materials, that can work with lower light intensities.

== See also ==
- Photoelectric effect
- Photomagnetism
