= Photomagnetism =

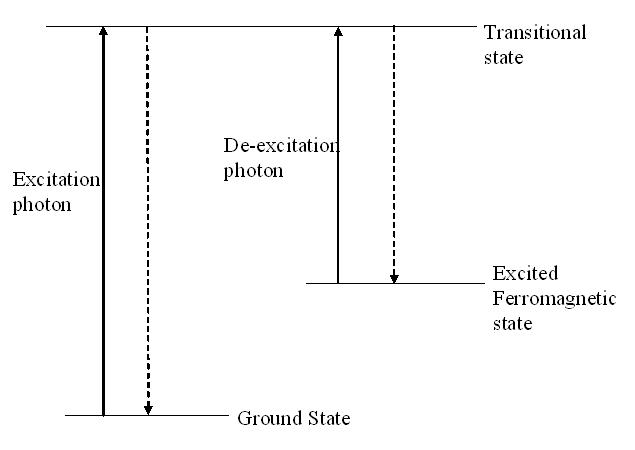
The energy diagram of the transitions between the ground state and the magnetic state. Solid arrows represent absorption of photons and dashed arrows represent non radiative processes

Photomagnetism (photomagnetic effect) is the effect in which a material acquires (and in some cases loses) its ferromagnetic properties in response to light. The current model for this phenomenon is a light-induced electron transfer, accompanied by the reversal of the spin direction of an electron. This leads to an increase in spin concentration, causing the magnetic transition. Currently the effect is only observed to persist (for any significant time) at very low temperature. But at temperatures such as 5K, the effect may persist for several days.

== Mechanism ==
The magnetisation and demagnetisation (where not demagnetised thermally) occur through intermediate states as shown (right). The magnetising and demagnetising wavelengths provide the energy for the system to reach the intermediate states which then relaxed non-radiatively to one of the two states (the intermediate state for magnetisation and demagnetisation are different and so the photon flux is not wasted by relaxation to the same state from which the system was just excited). A direct transition from the ground state to the magnetic state and, more importantly, vice versa is a forbidden transition, and this leads to the magnetised state being metastable and persisting for a long period at low temperatures.

== Prussian blue analogues ==
One of the most promising groups of molecular photomagnetic materials are Co-Fe Prussian blue analogues (i.e. compounds with the same structure and similar chemical make up to Prussian blue.) A Prussian blue analogue has a chemical formula M_{1-2x}Co_{1+x}[Fe(CN)_{6}]•zH_{2}O where x and z are variables (z may be zero) and M is an alkali metal. Prussian blue analogues have a face centre cubic structure.

It is essential that the structure be non-stoichiometric. In this case the iron molecules are randomly replaced by water (6 molecules of water per replaced iron). This non-stoichiometry is essential to the photomagnetism of Prussian blue analogues as regions which contain an iron vacancy are more stable in the non-magnetic state and regions without a vacancy are more stable in the magnetic state. By illumination by the correct frequency one or another of these regions can be locally changed to its more stable state from the bulk state, triggering the phase change of the entire molecule. The reverse phase change can be accomplished by exciting the other type of region by the appropriate frequency.

== See also ==
- Photomagnetic effect
- Photochromism
