= Stoletov curve =

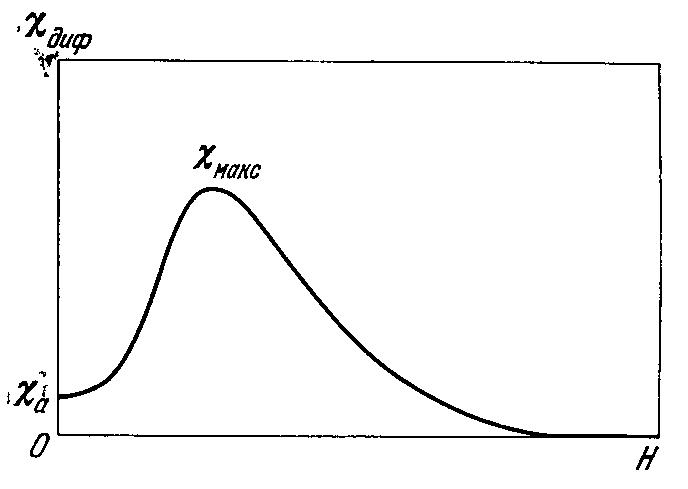
Stoletov curve

Stoletov curve shows the dependence of the magnetic permeability $\chi$ of ferromagnetics on the intensity of the applied magnetic field H. The curve is named after physicist Aleksandr Stoletov who analyzed in a long series of experiments the magnetic properties of iron rings in the period 1871–1872 during his stay at the Physical Laboratory of the University of Heidelberg.
