= Guido Altarelli =

Italian theoretical physicist

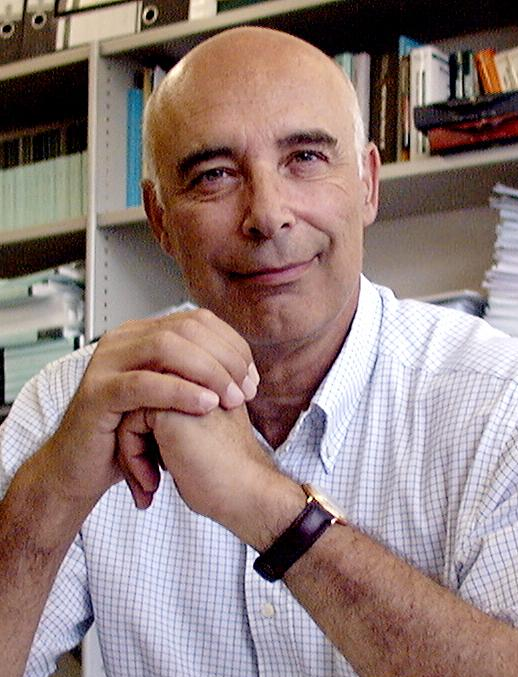
- Born: 12 July 1941; Rome, Italy
- Died: 30 September 2015 (aged 74); Geneva, Switzerland
- Education: Sapienza University of Rome
- Known for: Altarelli-Parisi equations
- Awards: Julius Wess Award (2011); J. J. Sakurai Prize for Theoretical Particle Physics (2012)
- Scientific career
- Fields: Theoretical physics
- Institutions: Sapienza University of Rome; University of Roma Tre

Guido Altarelli (12 July 1941 – 30 September 2015) was an Italian theoretical physicist.

== Biography ==
Altarelli graduated in Physics from the Sapienza University of Rome in 1963 with Raoul Gatto whom he followed to the University of Florence (1965–68). He held positions at New York University (1968–69), the Rockefeller University (New York, 1969–70), the École Normale Superieure in Paris (1976–77, 81) and Boston University (1985–86). In 1970-92 he held a faculty position at the Sapienza University of Rome (full professor of theoretical physics since 1980). He was Director of the Rome Section of the INFN (1985–87). In 1992 he moved to the newly established University of Roma Tre.

In 1987-2006 he was a Senior Staff Physicist at the Theory Division of CERN, and was Theory Division Leader from 2000-04. At CERN he had a leading role in the interpretation of SppS results, in the preparation of LEP and the LHC and in the theoretical analysis of the experimental results.

In 2011 Altarelli gave a talk The Mystery of Neutrino Mixing at the international symposium on subnuclear physics held in Vatican City.

His best known contribution, obtained with Giorgio Parisi in 1977, is the derivation of the QCD evolution equations for parton densities, known as the Altarelli- Parisi or DGLAP equations.

== Awards ==
- Member of the Polish Academy of Sciences
- 2011: Julius Wess Award for Outstanding Achievements in Elementary Particle and Astroparticle Physics - The Karlsruhe Institute of Technology
- 2012: J. J. Sakurai Prize for Theoretical Particle Physics - The American Physical Society
- 2015: High Energy and Particle Physics Prize - EPS HEPP Prize
