= DGLAP evolution equations =

The Dokshitzer–Gribov–Lipatov–Altarelli–Parisi (DGLAP) evolution equations are equations in quantum chromodynamics (QCD) describing the variation of parton distribution functions with varying energy scales. Experimentally observed scaling violation in deep inelastic scattering is important evidence for the correctness of the equations and of QCD in general. The equations were first published in the western world by Guido Altarelli and Giorgio Parisi in 1977, and so are still sometimes called the Altarelli–Parisi equations. Only later did it become known that an equivalent formula had been published in Russia by Yuri Dokshitzer in 1977, and by Vladimir Gribov and Lev Lipatov in 1972.

The DGLAP QCD evolution equations are widely used in global determinations of parton distributions, like those from the Coordinated Theoretical-Experimental Project (CTEQ) or NNPDF collaborations.

== See also ==
- Jet (particle physics)
- HERA
- APFEL (Software)
