= NNPDF =

Particle physics collaboration

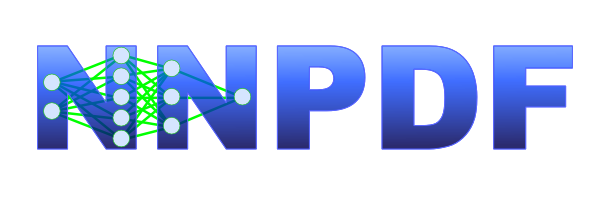
- Developer: The NNPDF Collaboration
- Stable release: 4.0
- Type: Particle physics
- Website: nnpdf.mi.infn.it

NNPDF is the acronym used to identify the parton distribution functions from the NNPDF Collaboration. NNPDF parton densities are extracted from global fits to data based on a combination of a Monte Carlo method for uncertainty estimation and the use of neural networks as basic interpolating functions.

== Methodology ==
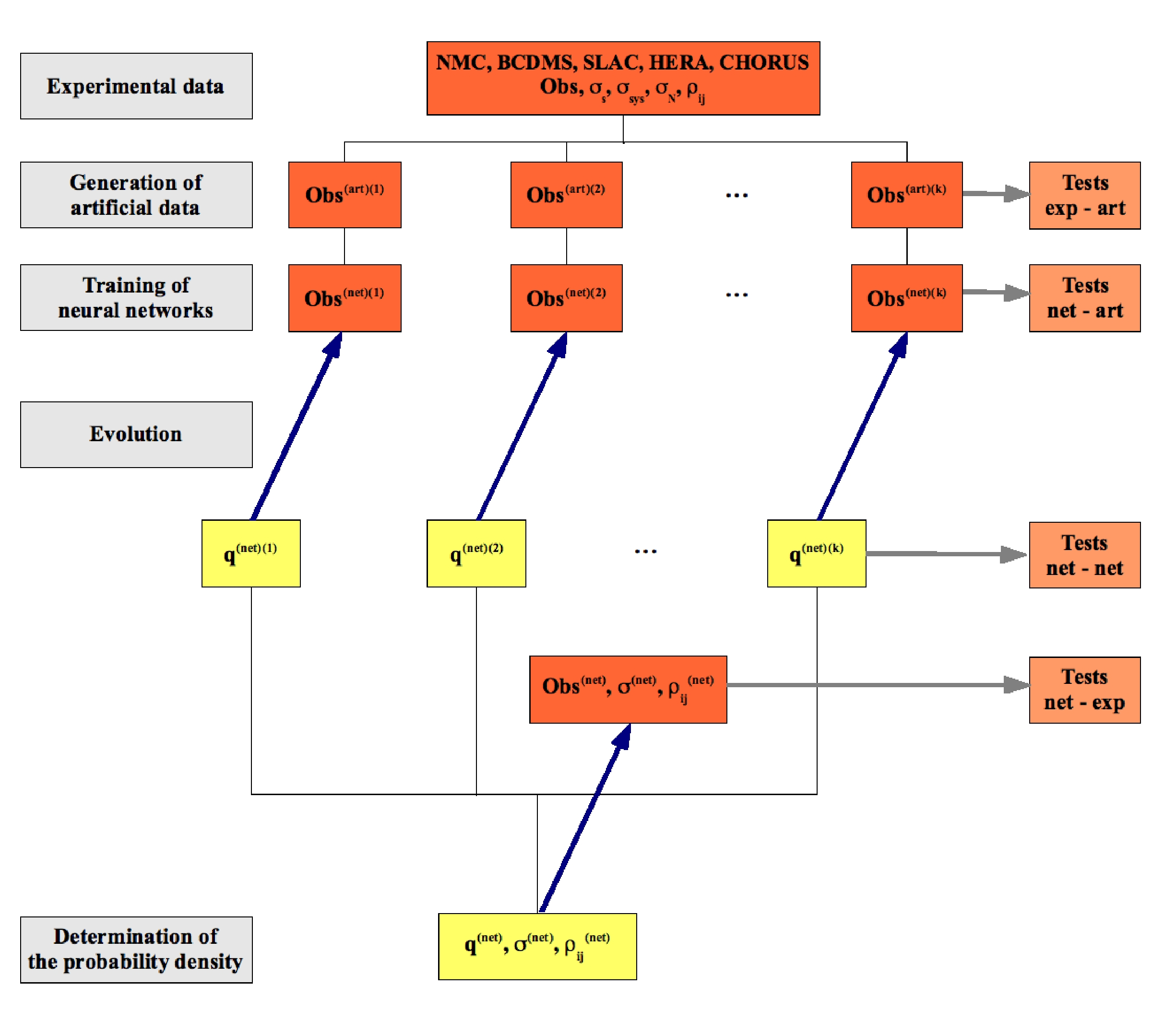
The NNPDF Collaboration strategy is summarized in this diagram.

The NNPDF approach can be divided into four main steps:

- The generation of a large sample of Monte Carlo replicas of the original experimental data, in a way that central values, errors and correlations are reproduced with enough accuracy.
- The training (minimization of the $\chi^2$) of a set of PDFs parametrized by neural networks on each of the above MC replicas of the data. PDFs are parametrized at the initial evolution scale $Q^{2}_{0}$ and then evolved to the experimental data scale $Q^2$ by means of the DGLAP equations. Since the PDF parametrization is redundant, the minimization strategy is based in genetic algorithms as well as gradient descent based minimizers.
- The neural network training is stopped dynamically before entering into the overlearning regime, that is, so that the PDFs learn the physical laws which underlie experimental data without fitting simultaneously statistical noise.
- Once the training of the MC replicas has been completed, a set of statistical estimators can be applied to the set of PDFs, in order to assess the statistical consistency of the results. For example, the stability with respect PDF parametrization can be explicitly verified.

The set of $N_{rep}$ PDF sets (trained neural networks) provides a representation of the underlying PDF probability density, from which any statistical estimator can be computed.

== Example ==
The image below shows the gluon at small-x from the NNPDF1.0 analysis, available through the LHAPDF interface

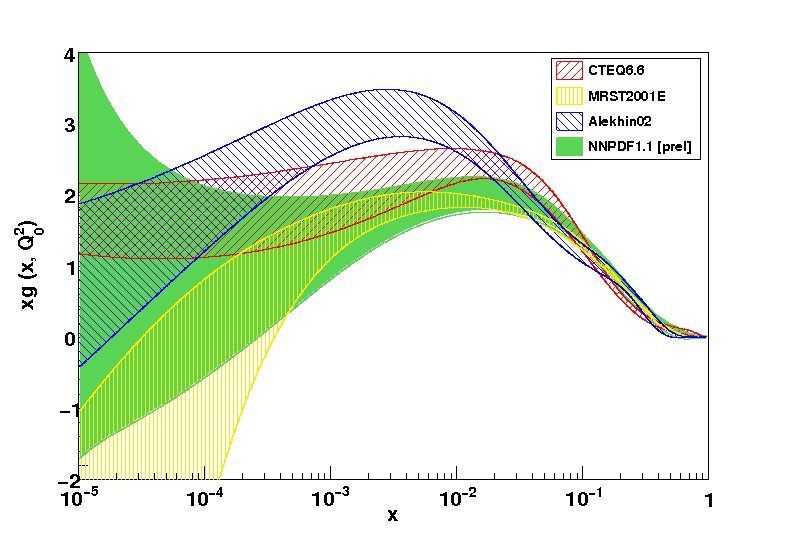
The NNPDF1.0 gluon

== Releases ==
The NNPDF releases are summarised in the following table:

PDF set	DIS data	Drell-Yan data	Jet data	LHC data	Independent param. of $s$ and $\bar{s}$	Heavy Quark masses	NNLO
NNPDF4.0	Yes	Yes	Yes	Yes	Yes	Yes	Yes
NNPDF3.1	Yes	Yes	Yes	Yes	Yes	Yes	Yes
NNPDF3.0	Yes	Yes	Yes	Yes	Yes	Yes	Yes
NNPDF2.3	Yes	Yes	Yes	Yes	Yes	Yes	Yes
NNPDF2.2	Yes	Yes	Yes	Yes	Yes	Yes	Yes
NNPDF2.1	Yes	Yes	Yes	No	Yes	Yes	Yes
NNPDF2.0	Yes	Yes	Yes	No	Yes	No	No
NNPDF1.2	Yes	No	No	No	Yes	No	No
NNPDF1.0	Yes	No	No	No	No	No	No

All PDF sets are available through the LHAPDF interface and in the NNPDF webpage.
