= Umov effect =

Relationship between albedo and polarization

The Umov effect, also known as Umov's law, is a relationship between the albedo of an astronomical object, and the degree of polarization of light reflecting off it. The effect was discovered by the Russian physicist Nikolay Umov in 1905, and can be observed for celestial objects such as the surface of the Moon and the asteroids.

The degree of linear polarization of light P is defined by

$$P = \frac{I_\perp - I_\|}{I_\perp + I_\|}\ ,$$

where $I_\perp$ and $I_\|$ are the intensities of light in the directions perpendicular and parallel to the plane of a polarizer aligned in the plane of reflection. Values of P are zero for unpolarized light, and ±1 for linearly polarized light.

Umov's law states

$$P \propto \frac{1}{\alpha}\ ,$$

where α is the albedo of the object. Thus, highly reflective objects tend to reflect mostly unpolarized light, and dimly reflective objects tend to reflect polarized light. The law is only valid for large phase angles (angles between the incident light and the reflected light).
