= Faddeev–Popov ghost =

Type of unphysical field in quantum field theory which provides mathematical consistency

In physics, Faddeev–Popov ghosts (also called Faddeev–Popov gauge ghosts or Faddeev–Popov ghost fields) are extraneous fields which are introduced into gauge quantum field theories to maintain the consistency of the path integral formulation. They are named after Ludvig Faddeev and Victor Popov.

A more general meaning of the word "ghost" in theoretical physics is discussed in Ghost (physics).

== Overcounting in Feynman path integrals ==
The necessity for Faddeev–Popov ghosts follows from the requirement that quantum field theories yield unambiguous, non-singular solutions. This is not possible in the path integral formulation when a gauge symmetry is present since there is no procedure for selecting among physically equivalent solutions related by gauge transformation. The path integrals overcount field configurations corresponding to the same physical state; the measure of the path integrals contains a factor which does not allow obtaining various results directly from the action.

=== Faddeev–Popov procedure ===
It is possible, however, to modify the action, such that methods such as Feynman diagrams will be applicable by adding ghost fields which break the gauge symmetry. The ghost fields do not correspond to any real particles in external states: they appear as virtual particles in Feynman diagrams – or as the absence of some gauge configurations. However, they are a necessary computational tool to preserve unitarity.

The exact form or formulation of ghosts is dependent on the particular gauge chosen, although the same physical results must be obtained with all gauges since the gauge one chooses to carry out calculations is an arbitrary choice. The Feynman–'t Hooft gauge is usually the simplest gauge for this purpose, and is assumed for the rest of this article.

Consider for example non-Abelian gauge theory with

$$\int \mathcal{D}[A] \exp i \int \mathrm d^4 x \left ( - \frac{1}{4} F^a_{\mu \nu} F^{a \mu \nu } \right ).$$

The integral needs to be constrained via gauge-fixing via $G(A) = 0$ to integrate only over physically distinct configurations. Following Faddeev and Popov, this constraint can be applied by inserting

$$1 = \int \mathcal{D}[\alpha (x) ] \delta (G(A^{\alpha })) \mathrm{det} \frac{\delta G(A^{\alpha} )}{\delta \alpha }$$

into the integral. $A^{\alpha }$ denotes the gauge-fixed field. The determinant is then expressed as a Berezin integral. Indeed, for any square matrix $M$, one has the identity

$$\int \exp\left[-\theta^TM\eta\right] \,d\theta\,d\eta = \det M$$

where the integration variables $\theta,\eta$ are Grassmann variables (aka supernumbers): they anti-commute and square to zero. In the present case, one introduces a field of Grassmann variables, one for every point in space-time (corresponding to the determinant at that point in space-time, i.e. one for each fiber of the gauge-field fiber bundle.) Used in the above identity for the determinant, these fields become the Fadeev-Popov ghost fields.

Because Grassmann numbers anti-commute, they resemble the anti-commutation property of the Pauli exclusion principle, and thus are sometimes taken to be stand-ins for particles with spin 1/2. This identification is somewhat treacherous, as the correct construction for spinors passes through the Clifford algebra, not the Grassmann algebra. The Clifford algebra has a natural filtration inherited from the tensor algebra; this induces a gradation, the associated graded algebra, which is naturally isomorphic to the Grassmann algebra. The details of this grading are presented at length in the article on Clifford algebras.

== Spin–statistics relation violated ==
The Faddeev–Popov ghosts violate the spin–statistics relation, which is another reason why they are often regarded as "non-physical" particles.

For example, in Yang–Mills theories (such as quantum chromodynamics) the ghosts are complex scalar fields (spin 0), but they anti-commute (like fermions).

In general, anti-commuting ghosts are associated with bosonic symmetries, while commuting ghosts are associated with fermionic symmetries.

== Gauge fields and associated ghost fields ==
Every gauge field has an associated ghost, and where the gauge field acquires a mass via the Higgs mechanism, the associated ghost field acquires the same mass (in the Feynman–'t Hooft gauge only, not true for other gauges).

== Appearance in Feynman diagrams ==
In Feynman diagrams, the ghosts appear as closed loops wholly composed of 3-vertices, attached to the rest of the diagram via a gauge particle at each 3-vertex. Their contribution to the S-matrix is exactly cancelled (in the Feynman–'t Hooft gauge) by a contribution from a similar loop of gauge particles with only 3-vertex couplings or gauge attachments to the rest of the diagram. (Note: Feynman discovered empirically that "boxing" and simply dismissing these diagrams restored unitarity. "Because, unfortunately, I also discovered in the process that the trouble is present in the Yang−Mills theory; and, secondly, I have incidentally discovered a tree−ring connection which is of very great interest and importance in the meson theories and so on. And so I'm stuck to have to continue this investigation, and of course you appreciate that this is the secret reason for doing any work, no matter how absurd and irrational and academic it looks: we all realize that no matter how small a thing is, if it has physical interest and is thought about carefully enough, you're bound to think of something that's good for something else.") (A loop of gauge particles not wholly composed of 3-vertex couplings is not cancelled by ghosts.) The opposite sign of the contribution of the ghost and gauge loops is due to them having opposite fermionic/bosonic natures. (Closed fermion loops have an extra −1 associated with them; bosonic loops don't.)

== Ghost field Lagrangian ==
The Lagrangian for the ghost fields $c^a(x)\,$ in Yang–Mills theories (where $a$ is an index in the adjoint representation of the gauge group) is given by

$$\mathcal{L}_{\text{ghost}}=\partial_{\mu}\bar{c}^{a}\partial^{\mu}c^{a}+gf^{abc}\left(\partial^{\mu}\bar{c}^{a}\right)A_{\mu}^{b}c^{c}\;.$$

The first term is a kinetic term like for regular complex scalar fields, and the second term describes the interaction with the gauge fields as well as the Higgs field. Note that in abelian gauge theories (such as quantum electrodynamics) the ghosts do not have any effect since the structure constants $f^{abc} = 0$ vanish. Consequently, the ghost particles do not interact with abelian gauge fields.
