= Non-abelian gauge transformation =

Symmetry transformation in particle physics for the strong and weak forces

In theoretical physics, a non-abelian gauge transformation means a gauge transformation taking values in some group G, the elements of which do not obey the commutative law when they are multiplied. By contrast, the original choice of gauge group in the physics of electromagnetism had been U(1), which is commutative.

For a non-abelian Lie group G, its elements do not commute, i.e. they in general do not satisfy

$$a*b=b*a \,$$.

The quaternions marked the introduction of non-abelian structures in mathematics.

In particular, its generators $t^a$, which form a basis for the vector space of infinitesimal transformations (the Lie algebra), have a commutation rule:

$$\left[t^a,t^b\right] = t^a t^b - t^b t^a = C^{abc} t_c.$$

The structure constants $C^{abc}$ quantify the lack of commutativity, and do not vanish. We can deduce that the structure constants are antisymmetric in the first two indices and real. The normalization is usually chosen (using the Kronecker delta) as

$$Tr(t^at^b) = \frac{1}{2}\delta^{ab}.$$

Within this orthonormal basis, the structure constants are then antisymmetric with respect to all three indices.

An element $\omega$ of the group can be expressed near the identity element in the form

$$\omega = exp(\theta^at^a)$$,

where $\theta^a$ are the parameters of the transformation.

Let $\varphi(x)$ be a field that transforms covariantly in a given representation $T(\omega)$. This means that under a transformation we get

$$\varphi(x) \to \varphi'(x) = T(\omega)\varphi(x).$$

Since any representation of a compact group is equivalent to a unitary representation, we take

$$T(\omega)$$

to be a unitary matrix without loss of generality. We assume that the Lagrangian $\mathcal{L}$ depends only on the field $\varphi(x)$ and the derivative $\partial_\mu\varphi(x)$:

$$\mathcal{L} = \mathcal{L}\big(\varphi(x),\partial_\mu\varphi(x)\big).$$

If the group element $\omega$ is independent of the spacetime coordinates (global symmetry), the derivative of the transformed field is equivalent to the transformation of the field derivatives:

$$\partial_\mu T(\omega)\varphi(x) = T(\omega)\partial_\mu\varphi(x).$$

Thus the field $\varphi$ and its derivative transform in the same way. By the unitarity of the representation, scalar products like $(\varphi,\varphi)$, $(\partial_\mu\varphi,\partial_\mu\varphi)$ or $(\varphi,\partial_\mu\varphi)$ are invariant under global transformation of the non-abelian group.

Any Lagrangian constructed out of such scalar products is globally invariant:

$$\mathcal{L}\big(\varphi(x),\partial_\mu\varphi(x)\big) = \mathcal{L}\big(T(\omega)\varphi(x),T(\omega)\partial_\mu \varphi(x)\big).$$
