= Aleksandr Stoletov =

Russian physicist

Alexander Grigorievich Stoletov
- Александр Григорьевич Столетов
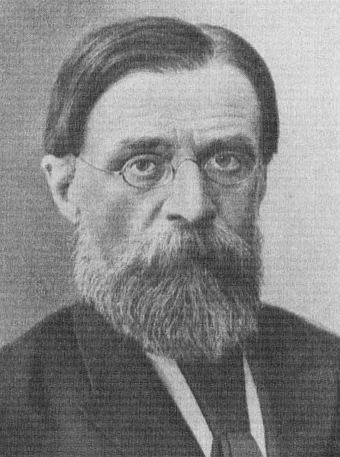
- Born: 10 August 1839; Vladimir, Vladimir Governorate, Russian Empire
- Died: 27 May 1896 (aged 56); Moscow, Moscow Governorate, Russian Empire
- Education: Lomonosov Moscow State University
- Known for: discovering the principles of photoelectric effect
- Scientific career
- Fields: Physics
- Workplaces: Lomonosov Moscow State University

Alexander Grigorievich Stoletov (Russian: Алекса́ндр Григо́рьевич Столе́тов; 10 August 1839 – 27 May 1896) was a Russian physicist, founder of electrical engineering, and professor in Moscow University. He was the brother of general Nikolai Stoletov.

== Biography ==
Alexander Stoletov defended his doctoral dissertation in 1872 and became professor at Moscow University a year later.

After defending his dissertation he became a renowned scientist worldwide. He attended the opening ceremony of the physical laboratory in Cambridge in 1874, and represented Russia at the first World Congress of Electricity in Paris in 1881, where he presented his work on links between electrostatic and electromagnetic values.

== Contribution to science ==
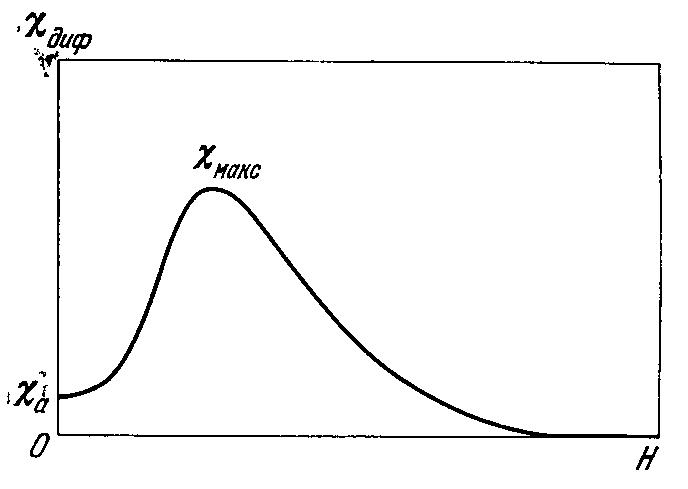
Stoletov curve

His major contributions include pioneer work in the field of ferromagnetism and discovery of the laws and principles of the outer photoelectric effect.

Achievements of Alexander Stoletov include:

Magnetism (1871–1872)

- Stoletov was the first to show that with the increase of the magnetic field the magnetic susceptibility of iron grows, but then begins to decrease.
- Built the curve of the magnetic permeability of ferromagnetics, known as the Stoletov curve.
- Developed two new methods for measuring magnetic properties of various materials.

Photoelectric effect (1888–1891)

- Studied the outer photoelectric effect, discovered by Hertz in 1887. Published the results in six works.
- Developed quantitative methods for the study of the photoelectric effect.
- Discovered the direct proportionality between the intensity of light and the corresponding photo induced current (Stoletov's law)
- Discovered the Stoletov constant which defines the ratio between the intensity of the electric current and the gas pressure under the maximum current.
- Built the first solar cell based on the outer photoelectric effect and estimated the response time of the photoelectric current.
- Discovered the decrease of the solar cell's sensitivity with time (fatigue of solar cells).

Other

- Calculated the proportion between electrodynamic and electrostatic units, producing a value very close to the speed of light.

== See also ==
- List of Russian inventors
- Stoletov Moon crater was named after Alexander Stoletov.

== Publications ==
Important published works of Alexander Stoletov include:

- On the Kohlrausch's measurement of the mercury unit of electric resistance;
- Sur une méthode pour déterminer le rapport des unités électromagnétiques et électrostatiques;
- On the electricity of juxtaposition;
- On the critical state of bodies (4 articles);
- Actino-electric research;
- Ether and electricity;
- Essay on the development of our knowledge of gases;
- Introduction into acoustics and optics.
