= Victor Popov =

Russian theoretical physicist

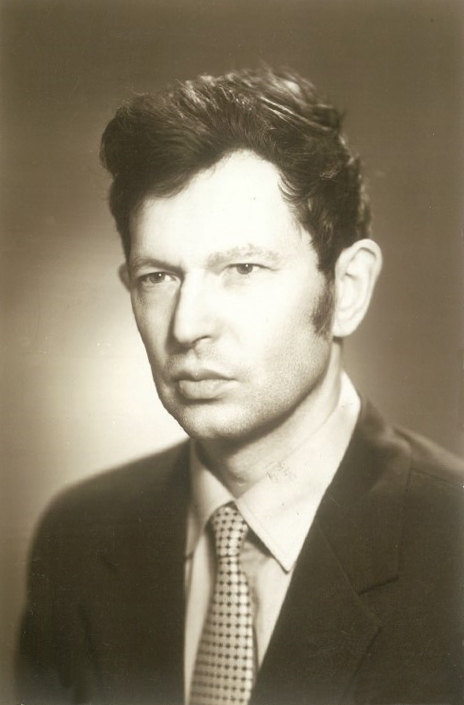
- Born: 27 October 1937
- Died: 16 April 1994 (aged 56)
- Education: Leningrad State University
- Known for: quantization of gauge fields; Faddeev–Popov ghosts
- Scientific career
- Fields: Quantum field theory
- Workplaces: Steklov Institute of Mathematics

Victor Nikolaevich Popov (Russian: Ви́ктор Никола́евич Попо́в; 27 October 1937 – 16 April 1994) was a Russian theoretical physicist known for his contribution to the quantization of non-abelian gauge fields. His work with Ludvig Faddeev on that subject introduced the fundamental objects now known as Faddeev–Popov ghosts.

Popov graduated from the Department of Theoretical Physics of the Physics Faculty of Leningrad State University. Popov formed a group at Leningrad Department of Steklov Institute of Mathematics of the USSR Academy of Sciences (LOMI) in early 1965, where he remained for life.

== Selected works ==
- L. D. Faddeev, L; V. N. Popov (1967). "Feynman diagrams for the Yang-Mills field". Physics Letters B. 25 (1): 29–30. Bibcode:1967PhLB...25...29F. doi:10.1016/0370-2693(67)90067-6.
- Konopleva N. P., Popov V. N. (1982): Gauge Fields. Gordon & Breach Publishing Group. ISBN 3-7186-0045-5. (Originally published in Russian in 1972)
