= Valentin Klimov =

Russian theoretical physicist and mathematician

Valentin Nikolayevich Klimov (Russian: Валентин Николаевич Kлимов) was a Russian theoretical physicist and mathematician. He was a co-developer of the RDS-37 (the Soviet Union's first two-stage thermonuclear device) and worked on statistical mechanics, plasmas and nuclear reactors.

== Career ==
Klimov was a student of Nikolay Bogolyubov at the Academy Institute for Chemical Physics. He worked as a laboratory assistant there, along with Dmitry Shirkov. Director Nikolay Semyonov assented to Bogolyubov's suggestion that they be employed as full-time workers. Klimov worked in a single, secure room with his colleagues. In March 1950, he and other researchers were given short notice to move, again under tight security, to what was known as KB-11 ('Design Bureau-11') or Arzamas-16, the closed city of Sarov, Nizhny Novgorod Oblast (today it is the All-Russian Scientific Research Institute of Experimental Physics (VNIIEF)).

The purpose was to develop the Soviet hydrogen bomb. He was involved in calculations including for many-layered nuclear systems and neutron moderation. Klimov, Shirkov, Vasily Vladimirov, I.А. Zhernak and А.А. Bunatyan developed mathematical approaches to tasks involving neutron propagation and thermalisation.

In another team of Bogolyubov's, with Dmitry Zubarev and Yuri Tserkovnikov, he investigated magnetic thermonuclear reactor design, studied the behaviour and stability of plasma contained in a magnetic field and the interaction between the plasma and the reactor vessel wall. With Zubarev, he wrote a number of papers on plasma physics, developed the theory of temperature jumps at the plasma boundary in a magnetic field, and wrote on stationary conditions in a magnetic thermonuclear reactor. Klimov did not get on well with Bogolyubov (who had a more fruitful professional relationship with both Shirkov and Zubarev), and once Bogolyubov was given permission to leave "the Installation", Andrei Sakharov took Klimov into his group. The RDS-6 bomb, Sakharov's 'layer cake' design on which Klimov had done a part of the theoretical work, was tested in 1953. Klimov was one of the fifteen authors of the design report detailing the configuration and calculations for the RDS-6's successor, the first Soviet two-stage nuclear device, the RDS-37.

== Personality ==
Klimov regularly ridiculed perceived lies in press reports. He was regarded as a pioneer of different thinking by some, supporting people's rights, and was openly defiant, to the surprise and dismay of his colleagues who considered such behaviour perilous. He was often called to the gorkom (political committee) to receive warnings.

At KB-11, Klimov quickly became the outdoor activities leader in the group in swimming, walking, running at the local stadium and any other athletic pursuits. He was killed before his thirtieth year in a snow avalanche in the Caucusus mountains.
