= Weakly interacting Bose gas =

Quantum mechanical system

Energy dispersion relation of a weakly interacting gas, for low momentum it behaves ballistically (linear), for large momentum it behaves quadratically as an ideal Bose gas, in the middle there is a dip related to the formation of rotons (where it is no longer weakly-interacting).

In condensed matter physics, a weakly interacting Bose gas is a quantum mechanical system composed of bosons that interact through low-strength, typically repulsive short-range forces. Unlike the ideal Bose gas, which neglects all interactions, the weakly interacting Bose gas provides a more realistic model for understanding Bose–Einstein condensation and superfluidity. Its behavior is well-described by mean-field theories such as the Gross–Pitaevskii equation and Bogoliubov theory, which capture the effects of interactions on the condensate and its excitations. This model is foundational in the study of ultracold atomic gases, where experimental techniques allow precise control of both the particle density and interaction strength, enabling detailed exploration of quantum statistical phenomena in dilute bosonic systems.

The microscopic model was first discussed by Nikolai Bogoliubov in 1947.

In one-dimension, the weakly interacting Bose gas is described by the Lieb–Liniger model.

== Description ==
In the continuous limit the Hamiltonian is given in second quantization

$$\hat{H}=\frac{\hbar^2}{2m} \int \mathrm d^3 r\, \nabla \hat{\phi}^\dagger(\mathbf r) \cdot \nabla \hat{\phi} (\mathbf r)+\frac{g}{2}\int \mathrm d^3 r \int \mathrm d^3 r' \hat{\phi}^\dagger(\mathbf r)\hat{\phi}^\dagger(\mathbf r')\hat{\phi}(\mathbf r')\hat{\phi}(\mathbf r)\delta^3(\mathbf r - \mathbf r') ,$$

where $\hbar$ is the reduced Planck constant, m is the mass of the bosons, $\hat{\phi}(\mathbf r)$ is the field operator and the second term in the Hamiltonian is a momentum-idenpendent Dirac delta interaction potential. The coupling constant $g>0$ can be thought in terms s-wave scattering length $a_{\mathrm s}$ of two interacting bosons:

$$g = \frac{4\pi\hbar^2 a_{\mathrm s}}{m}.$$

If g is negative, the fluid is thermodynamically unstable.

In a discrete box of volume $\mathcal{V}$, one can perform a Fourier transform and write it as

$$H=\sum_{\mathbf p} \frac{\mathbf p^2}{2m}\hat{a}^\dagger_{\mathbf p}\hat{a}_{\mathbf p}+\frac{g}{2\mathcal{V}}\sum_{\mathbf{kpq}}\hat{a}^\dagger_{\mathbf p - \mathbf q}\hat{a}^\dagger_{\mathbf k+\mathbf q}\hat{a}_{\mathbf k}\hat{a}_{\mathbf p}$$,

where $\hat{a}^\dagger_{\mathbf p}$ and $\hat{a}_{\mathbf p}$ are the creation and annihilation operators of bosons with momentum p. This Hamiltonian does not have an exact analytical solution. Note that the Hamiltonian has unitary group U(1) global symmetry (invariant when replacing $a_{\mathbf p}\to a_{\mathbf p }e^{i\alpha}$, for contant $\alpha$ independent of momentum).

=== Bogoliubov approximation ===
For a dilute low temperature gas, one consider that the number of particles in the ground state $|\Omega\rangle$ is so large that we can approximate

$$\hat{a}_0|\Omega\rangle\approx \sqrt{N_0}|\Omega\rangle;$$
$$\hat{a}^\dagger_0|\Omega\rangle\approx \sqrt{N_0}|\Omega\rangle,$$

where $N_0\gg1$ is the number of particles in the ground-state. This manipulation is known as Bogoliubov's approximation.

By using Bogoliubov's approximation, keeping only quadratic terms and imposing the number of particles as

$$N=N_0+\sum_{\mathbf p \neq 0}\hat{a}^\dagger_{\mathbf p}\hat{a}_{\mathbf p} ,$$

an effective Hamiltonian can be obtained

$$H\approx\frac{gnN}{2}+\sum_{\mathbf p\neq 0} \left(\frac{\mathbf p^2}{2m}+ng\right)\hat{a}^\dagger_{\mathbf p}\hat{a}_{\mathbf p}+\frac{gn}{2}\sum_{\mathbf p\neq 0}(\hat{a}^\dagger_{\mathbf p}\hat{a}^\dagger_{-\mathbf p}+\hat{a}_{\mathbf p}\hat{a}_{-\mathbf p}),$$

where $n=N/\mathcal{V}$. This Hamiltonian no longer has the U(1) symmetry of the original Hamiltonian, the ground-state breaks the symmetry and the total number of particles is no longer conserved. The effective Hamiltonian can be diagonalized using a Bogoliubov transformation, such that

$$H=E_0+\sum_{\mathbf p} E_{\mathbf p}\hat{\alpha}^\dagger_{\mathbf p}\hat{\alpha}_{\mathbf p} ,$$

where

$$E_0=\frac{gn^2\mathcal{V}}{2}-\frac{1}{2}\sum_{\mathbf p\neq0}\left(\frac{\mathbf p^2}{2m}+gn -E_{\mathbf p}\right),$$

is the ground state energy and $\hat{\alpha}_{\mathbf p}$ are the diagonalized operators with energies,

$$E_{\mathbf p}=\sqrt{\frac{\mathbf p^2}{2m}\left(\frac{\mathbf p^2}{2m}+2ng\right)},$$

under these new operators the system can be taught as a condensate (gas) of quasiparticles, sometimes called bogolons. The bogolons are Goldstone bosons due to the broken symmetry of Hamiltonian, and per Goldstone theorem are gapless and linear at low momenta

$$E_{\mathbf p}\approx c_{\mathrm s}|\mathbf p|$$

where $c_{\mathrm s}=\sqrt{ng/m}$ is associated with the speed of sound of the quasiparticle condensate and it is called the second sound. Per Landau criterion, the system can only present superfluidity below $c_{\mathrm s}$, above this limit dissipation can occur.

For large momenta, the dispersion is quadratic and the system behaves as an ideal Bose gas. The transition between ballistic and quadratic regime is given when $\hbar^2/(2m\xi^2) = 2ng$, where $|\mathbf p|=\hbar /\xi$ and $\xi$ is referred as the healing length.

Bogoliubov's theory of the weakly interacting gas does not predict in the dispersion at intermediate momenta due to rotons.

=== Ground state energy corrections ===
The ground state energy $E_0$ calculated above is actually divergent and can be rendered finite by calculating higher-order corrections. The next order correction gives

$$E_0=\frac{gn^2\mathcal{V}}{2}\left( 1+ \frac{128}{15} \sqrt{\frac{na_{\mathrm s}^3}{\pi}}\right),$$

which provides a pressure

$$P_0=-\frac{\partial E_0}{\partial \mathcal{V}}=\frac{gn^2}{2}\left( 1+ \frac{64}{5} \sqrt{\frac{na_{\mathrm s}^3}{\pi}}\right)$$

and a chemical potential

$$\mu=\frac{\partial E_0}{N}=gn\left( 1+ \frac{32}{3} \sqrt{\frac{na_{\mathrm s}^3}{\pi}}\right).$$

Using the formula for the speed of sound $mc_{\mathrm s}^2=(\partial P_0/\partial n)$, one can confirm that $c_{\mathrm s}=\sqrt{ng/m}$ at the lowest order of approximation.

== Macroscopic treatment ==
The macroscopic treatment is written using (stationary) Gross–Pitaevskii equation,

$\left(-\frac{\hbar}{2m}\nabla^2+g|\Psi(\mathbf r,t)|^2\right)\Psi(\mathbf r,t)=i\hbar \frac{\partial}{\partial t}\Psi(\mathbf r,t)$

This equation is a non-linear and allows for soliton-like solutions. It can be shown that the spectrum of the Gross–Pitaevski equation, when linearized, recovers the Bogoliubov spectrum.

== History ==
After the discovery of superfluidity, Lev Landau estimated in 1941 that the spectrum should contain phonons (linear dispersion) at low momenta and rotons at large momenta. The microscopic model was first discussed by Nikolai Bogoliubov in 1947, however the paper was rejected by the Soviet Journal of Physics. Bogoliubov convinced Landau of its importance and the paper was accepted. The quantum field theory was generalized further by Spartak Belyaev in 1958.

Lee–Huang–Yang correction, the next-order corrections to the Bogoliubov groundstate, were calculated by T. D. Lee, Kerson Huang and C. N. Yang in 1957.

The first extension to non-uniform gases was carried independently by Eugene P. Gross and Lev Pitaevskii in 1961, leading to the Gross–PItaevskii equation.

The Bogoliubov excitation spectrum was first measured in 1998 by the team of Wolfgang Ketterle. They used the two photon Bragg scattering spectroscopy technique in atomic Bose–Einstein condensates.
