= Parasyuk =

Parasyuk or Parasiuk (Ukrainian or Russian: Парасюк) is a gender-neutral Ukrainian surname. It may refer to

- Ostap Parasyuk (1921–2007), Ukrainian theoretical physicist
  - Bogoliubov–Parasyuk theorem
- Volodymyr Parasyuk (born 1987), Ukrainian MP and public figure
- Wilson Parasiuk (born 1943), Canadian entrepreneur and politician
