= Bogoliubov quasiparticle =

Quasiparticle occurring in superconductors

In condensed matter physics, a Bogoliubov quasiparticle or bogolon is a quasiparticle that occurs in superconductivity and superfluidity. They are present in BCS theory of superconductors and in Bose–Einstein (BEC) condensates. These quasiparticles are named after Nikolay Bogolyubov who studied the microscopic model of these systems. Theoretically, bogolons originate from a quadratic Hamiltonian that can be diagonalized through a Bogoliubov transformation.

Sometimes these quasiparticles are also called Majorana modes, in analogy with the equations for Majorana fermions.

== Superconductivity ==
Whereas superconductivity is characterized by the condensation of Cooper pairs into the same ground quantum state, bogolons are elementary excitations above the ground state, which are superpositions (linear combinations) of the excitations of negatively charged electrons and positively charged electron holes, and are therefore neutral spin-½ fermions. When a Cooper pair breaks, two bogolons form.

When dealing with conventional superconductors, interference between bogolons is hard for a scanning tunneling microscope to see.

== Bose gases ==
In a weakly interacting Bose gas, the bogolons are resulting quasiparticles that have linear dispersion.

== Interaction ==
There is evidence that graphene can turn superconducting when interacting with a Bose–Einstein condensate. This is possible through the interaction between graphene electrons and bogolons of the condensate.
