= Gross–Pitaevskii equation =

Description of the ground state of a quantum system

The Gross–Pitaevskii equation (GPE, named after Eugene P. Gross and Lev Petrovich Pitaevskii) describes the ground state of a quantum system of identical bosons using the Hartree–Fock approximation and the pseudopotential interaction model.

A Bose–Einstein condensate (BEC) is a gas of bosons that are in the same quantum state, and thus can be described by the same wavefunction. A free quantum particle is described by a single-particle Schrödinger equation. Interaction between particles in a real gas is taken into account by a pertinent many-body Schrödinger equation. In the Hartree–Fock approximation, the total wave-function $\Psi$ of the system of $N$ bosons is taken as a product of single-particle functions $\psi$:
$$\Psi(\mathbf{r}_1, \mathbf{r}_2, \dots, \mathbf{r}_N) = \psi(\mathbf{r}_1) \psi(\mathbf{r}_2) \dots \psi(\mathbf{r}_N),$$
where $\mathbf{r}_i$ is the coordinate of the $i$-th boson. If the average spacing between the particles in a gas is greater than the scattering length (that is, in the so-called dilute limit), then one can approximate the true interaction potential that features in this equation by a pseudopotential. At sufficiently low temperature, where the de Broglie wavelength is much longer than the range of boson–boson interaction, the scattering process can be well approximated by the s-wave scattering (i.e. $\ell = 0$ in the partial-wave analysis, a.k.a. the hard-sphere potential) term alone. In that case, the pseudopotential model Hamiltonian of the system can be written as
$$H = \sum_{i=1}^N \left(-\frac{\hbar^2}{2m} \frac{\partial^2}{\partial\mathbf{r}_i^2} + V(\mathbf{r}_i)\right)
+ \sum_{i<j} \frac{4\pi\hbar^2 a_s}{m} \delta(\mathbf{r}_i - \mathbf{r}_j),$$
where $m$ is the mass of the boson, $V$ is the external potential, $a_s$ is the boson–boson s-wave scattering length, and $\delta(\mathbf{r})$ is the Dirac delta-function.

The variational method shows that if the single-particle wavefunction satisfies the following Gross–Pitaevskii equation
$$\left(-\frac{\hbar^2}{2m} \frac{\partial^2}{\partial\mathbf{r}^2} + V(\mathbf{r}) + \frac{4\pi\hbar^2 a_s}{m} |\psi(\mathbf{r})|^2\right) \psi(\mathbf{r}) = \mu\psi(\mathbf{r}),$$
the total wave-function minimizes the expectation value of the model Hamiltonian under normalization condition $\int dV\, |\Psi|^2 = N.$ Therefore, such single-particle wavefunction describes the ground state of the system.

GPE is a model equation for the ground-state single-particle wavefunction in a Bose–Einstein condensate. It is similar in form to the Ginzburg–Landau equation and is sometimes referred to as the nonlinear Schrödinger equation.

The non-linearity of the Gross–Pitaevskii equation has its origin in the interaction between the particles: setting the coupling constant of interaction in the Gross–Pitaevskii equation to zero (see the following section) recovers the single-particle Schrödinger equation describing a particle inside a trapping potential.

The Gross–Pitaevskii equation is said to be limited to the weakly interacting regime. Nevertheless, it may also fail to reproduce interesting phenomena even within this regime. In order to study the BEC beyond that limit of weak interactions, one needs to implement the Lee–Huang–Yang correction. Alternatively, in 1D systems one can use either an exact approach, namely the Lieb-Liniger model, or an extended equation, e.g. the Lieb-Liniger Gross–Pitaevskii equation (sometimes called modified or generalized nonlinear Schrödinger equation).

== Form of equation ==
The equation has the form of the Schrödinger equation with the addition of an interaction term. The coupling constant $g$ is proportional to the s-wave scattering length $a_s$ of two interacting bosons:

$$g = \frac{4\pi\hbar^2 a_s}{m},$$

where $\hbar$ is the reduced Planck constant, and $m$ is the mass of the boson. The energy density is

$$\mathcal{E} = \frac{\hbar^2}{2m} |\nabla\Psi(\mathbf{r})|^2 + V(\mathbf{r}) |\Psi(\mathbf{r})|^2 + \frac{1}{2} g |\Psi(\mathbf{r})|^4,$$

where $\Psi$ is the wavefunction, or order parameter, and $V$ is the external potential (e.g. a harmonic trap). The time-independent Gross–Pitaevskii equation, for a conserved number of particles, is

$$\mu \Psi(\mathbf{r}) = \left(-\frac{\hbar^2}{2m} \nabla^2 + V(\mathbf{r}) + g |\Psi(\mathbf{r})|^2\right) \Psi(\mathbf{r}),$$

where $\mu$ is the chemical potential, which is found from the condition that the number of particles is related to the wavefunction by

$$N = \int |\Psi(\mathbf{r})|^2 \, d^3r.$$

From the time-independent Gross–Pitaevskii equation, we can find the structure of a Bose–Einstein condensate in various external potentials (e.g. a harmonic trap).

The time-dependent Gross–Pitaevskii equation is

$$i\hbar\frac{\partial\Psi(\mathbf{r}, t)}{\partial t} = \left(-\frac{\hbar^2}{2m} \nabla^2 + V(\mathbf{r}) + g |\Psi(\mathbf{r}, t)|^2\right) \Psi(\mathbf{r}, t).$$

From this equation we can look at the dynamics of the Bose–Einstein condensate. It is used to find the collective modes of a trapped gas.

== Solutions ==
Since the Gross–Pitaevskii equation is a nonlinear partial differential equation, exact solutions are hard to come by. As a result, solutions have to be approximated via a myriad of techniques.

=== Exact solutions ===
==== Free particle ====
The simplest exact solution is the free-particle solution, with $V(\mathbf{r}) = 0$:

$$\Psi(\mathbf{r}) = \sqrt{\frac{N}{V}} e^{i\mathbf{k}\cdot\mathbf{r}}.$$

This solution is often called the Hartree solution. Although it does satisfy the Gross–Pitaevskii equation, it leaves a gap in the energy spectrum due to the interaction:

$$E(\mathbf{k}) = N \left[ \frac{\hbar^2 k^2}{2m} + g \frac{N}{2 V}\right].$$

According to the Hugenholtz–Pines theorem, an interacting Bose gas does not exhibit an energy gap (in the case of repulsive interactions).

==== Soliton ====
A one-dimensional soliton can form in a Bose–Einstein condensate, and depending upon whether the interaction is attractive or repulsive, there is either a bright or dark soliton. Both solitons are local disturbances in a condensate with a uniform background density.

If the BEC is repulsive, so that $g > 0$, then a possible solution of the Gross–Pitaevskii equation is

$$\psi(x) = \psi_0 \tanh\left(\frac{x}{\sqrt{2}\xi}\right),$$

where $\psi_0$ is the value of the condensate wavefunction at $\infty$, and $\xi = \hbar/\sqrt{2m n_0 g}$ is the coherence length (a.k.a. the healing length, see below). This solution represents the dark soliton, since there is a deficit of condensate in a space of nonzero density. The dark soliton is also a type of topological defect, since $\psi$ flips between positive and negative values across the origin, corresponding to a $\pi$ phase shift.

For $g < 0$ the solution is

$$\psi(x, t) = \psi(0) e^{-i\mu t/\hbar} \frac{1}{\cosh\left(\sqrt{2m|\mu|/\hbar^2}x\right)},$$

where the chemical potential is $\mu = g |\psi(0)|^2/2$. This solution represents the bright soliton, since there is a concentration of condensate in a space of zero density.

=== Healing length ===
The healing length gives the minimum distance over which the order parameter can heal, which describes how quickly the wave function of the BEC can adjust to changes in the potential. If the condensate density grows from 0 to n within a distance ξ, the healing length can calculated by equating the

quantum pressure and the interaction energy:

$$\frac{\hbar^2}{2m\xi^2} = gn \implies \xi=(8\pi n a_s)^{-1/2}$$

The healing length must be much smaller than any length scale in the solution of the single-particle wavefunction. The healing length also determines the size of vortices that can form in a superfluid. It is the distance over which the wavefunction recovers from zero in the center of the vortex to the value in the bulk of the superfluid (hence the name "healing" length).

=== Variational solutions ===
In systems where an exact analytical solution may not be feasible, one can make a variational approximation. The basic idea is to make a variational ansatz for the wavefunction with free parameters, plug it into the free energy, and minimize the energy with respect to the free parameters.

=== Numerical solutions ===
Several numerical methods, such as the split-step Crank–Nicolson and Fourier spectral methods, have been used for solving GPE. There are also different Fortran and C programs for its solution for the contact interaction and long-range dipolar interaction.

=== Thomas–Fermi approximation ===
If the number of particles in a gas is very large, the interatomic interaction becomes large so that the kinetic energy term can be neglected in the Gross–Pitaevskii equation. This is called the Thomas–Fermi approximation and leads to the single-particle wavefunction

$$\psi(x, t) = \sqrt{\frac{\mu - V(x)}{Ng}}.$$

And the density profile is

$$n(x, t) =\frac{\mu - V(x)}{g}.$$

In a harmonic trap (where the potential energy is quadratic with respect to displacement from the center), this gives a density profile commonly referred to as the "inverted parabola" density profile.

=== Bogoliubov approximation ===
Bogoliubov treatment of the Gross–Pitaevskii equation is a method that finds the elementary excitations of a Bose–Einstein condensate. To that purpose, the condensate wavefunction is approximated by a sum of the equilibrium wavefunction $\psi_0 = \sqrt{n} e^{-i\mu t}$ and a small perturbation $\delta\psi$:

$$\psi = \psi_0 + \delta\psi.$$

Then this form is inserted in the time-dependent Gross–Pitaevskii equation and its complex conjugate, and linearized to first order in $\delta\psi$:

$$i\hbar\frac{\partial\delta\psi}{\partial t} = -\frac{\hbar^2}{2m} \nabla^2 \delta\psi + V\delta\psi + g(2|\psi_0|^2\delta\psi + \psi_0^2\delta\psi^*),$$
$$-i\hbar\frac{\partial\delta\psi^*}{\partial t} = -\frac{\hbar^2}{2m} \nabla^2 \delta\psi^* + V\delta\psi^* + g(2|\psi_0|^2\delta\psi^* + (\psi_0^*)^2\delta\psi).$$

Assuming that

$$\delta\psi = e^{-i\mu t} \big(u(\boldsymbol{r}) e^{-i\omega t} - v^*(\boldsymbol{r}) e^{i\omega t}\big),$$

one finds the following coupled differential equations for $u$ and $v$ by taking the $e^{\pm i\omega t}$ parts as independent components:

$$\left(-\frac{\hbar^2}{2m} \nabla^2 + V + 2gn - \hbar\mu - \hbar\omega\right) u - gnv = 0,$$
$$\left(-\frac{\hbar^2}{2m} \nabla^2 + V + 2gn - \hbar\mu + \hbar\omega\right) v - gnu = 0.$$

For a homogeneous system, i.e. for $V(\boldsymbol{r}) = \text{const}$, one can get $V = \hbar\mu - gn$ from the zeroth-order equation. Then we assume $u$ and $v$ to be plane waves of momentum $\boldsymbol{q}$, which leads to the energy spectrum

$$\hbar\omega = \epsilon_\boldsymbol{q} = \sqrt{\frac{\hbar^2|\boldsymbol{q}|^2}{2m} \left(\frac{\hbar^2|\boldsymbol{q}|^2}{2m} + 2gn\right)}.$$

For large $\boldsymbol{q}$, the dispersion relation is quadratic in $\boldsymbol{q}$, as one would expect for usual non-interacting single-particle excitations. For small $\boldsymbol{q}$, the dispersion relation is linear:

$$\epsilon_\boldsymbol{q} = s \hbar q,$$

with $s = \sqrt{ng/m}$ being the speed of sound in the condensate, also known as second sound. The fact that $\epsilon_\boldsymbol{q}/(\hbar q) > s$ shows, according to Landau's criterion, that the condensate is a superfluid, meaning that if an object is moved in the condensate at a velocity inferior to s, it will not be energetically favorable to produce excitations, and the object will move without dissipation, which is a characteristic of a superfluid. Experiments have been done to prove this superfluidity of the condensate, using a tightly focused blue-detuned laser. The same dispersion relation is found when the condensate is described from a microscopical approach to the weakly interacting Bose gas using the formalism of second quantization.

=== Superfluid in rotating helical potential ===
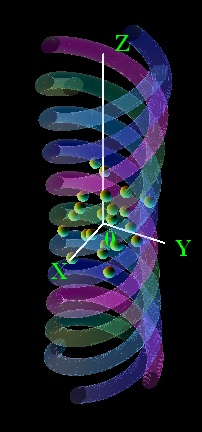
Vortex dipole trap with topological charge $\ell = 2$ loaded by ultracold ensemble

The optical potential well $V_\text{twist}(\mathbf{r}, t) = V_\text{twist}(z, r, \theta, t)$ might be formed by two counterpropagating optical vortices with wavelengths $\lambda_\pm = 2 \pi c/\omega_\pm$, effective width $D$ and topological charge $\ell$:

$$E_\pm(\mathbf{r}, t) \sim \exp\left(-\frac{r^2}{2 D^2}\right) r^{|\ell|} \exp(-i\omega_\pm t \pm ik_\pm z + i\ell \theta),$$

where $\delta\omega = (\omega_+ - \omega_-)$. In cylindrical coordinate system $(z, r, \theta)$ the potential well have a remarkable double-helix geometry:

$$V_\text{twist}(\mathbf{r}, t) \sim
V_0 \exp\left(-\frac{r^2}{D^2}\right) r^{2|\ell|} \left(1 + \cos[\delta\omega t + (k_+ + k_-)z + 2\ell \theta]\right).$$

In a reference frame rotating with angular velocity $\Omega = \delta\omega / 2\ell$, time-dependent Gross–Pitaevskii equation with helical potential is

$$i\hbar\frac{\partial\Psi(\mathbf{r}, t)}{\partial t} =
\left(-\frac{\hbar^2}{2m} \nabla^2 + V_\text{twist}(\mathbf{r}) + g |\Psi(\mathbf{r}, t)|^2 - \Omega \hat L \right) \Psi(\mathbf{r}, t),$$

where $\hat L = -i\hbar \frac{\partial}{\partial\theta}$ is the angular-momentum operator. The solution for condensate wavefunction $\Psi(\mathbf{r}, t)$ is a superposition of two phase-conjugated matter–wave vortices:

$$\Psi(\mathbf{r}, t) \sim \exp\left(-\frac{r^2}{2D^2}\right) r^{|\ell|} \times
\big(\exp(-i\omega_+ t + ik_+ z + i\ell \theta) + \exp(-i\omega_- t - ik_- z - i\ell \theta) \big).$$

The macroscopically observable momentum of condensate is

$$\langle \Psi | \hat P | \Psi \rangle = N_\text{at} \hbar (k_+ - k_-),$$

where $N_\text{at}$ is number of atoms in condensate. This means that atomic ensemble moves coherently along $z$ axis with group velocity whose direction is defined by signs of topological charge $\ell$ and angular velocity $\Omega$:

$$V_z = \frac{2\Omega \ell}{k_+ + k_-}.$$

The angular momentum of helically trapped condensate is exactly zero:

$$\langle \Psi | \hat L | \Psi \rangle = N_\text{at} [\ell\hbar - \ell\hbar] = 0.$$

Numerical modeling of cold atomic ensemble in spiral potential have shown the confinement of individual atomic trajectories within helical potential well.

== Derivations and generalisations ==
The Gross–Pitaevskii equation can also be derived as the semi-classical limit of the many body theory of s-wave interacting identical bosons represented in terms of coherent states. The semi-classical limit is reached for a large number of quanta, expressing the field theory either in the positive-P representation (generalised Glauber-Sudarshan P representation) or Wigner representation.

Finite-temperature effects can be treated within a generalised Gross–Pitaevskii equation by including scattering between condensate and noncondensate atoms, from which the Gross–Pitaevskii equation may be recovered in the low-temperature limit.
