= Spartak Belyaev =

Russian physicist

- Спартак Тимофеевич Беляев
- Born: 27 October 1923; Russia
- Died: 5 January 2017 (aged 93); Moscow, Russia
- Education: Moscow Institute of Physics and Technology,
- Known for: Weakly interacting Bose gas
- Awards: Lomonosov Gold Medal
- Scientific career
- Fields: Physicist
- Workplaces: Kurchatov Institute, Novosibirsk State University, Budker Institute of Nuclear Physics, Moscow Institute of Physics and Technology

Spartak Timofeyevich Belyaev (October 27, 1923 – January 5, 2017) was a Soviet and Russian theoretical physicist who was awarded a Lomonosov Gold Medal.

== Biography ==
Belyaev was born on October 27, 1923, in Moscow, Russia. When World War II began, he graduated from high school and by August 1941 enlisted himself into the Army as a volunteer. During that time he participated in various battles in Caucasus and liberation of Poland in 1945. After long years of war, he declined the offer on keeping the career and instead decided to become a physicist by applying to the Moscow State University.

Two years later he already got a job there as a researcher at the Atomic Energy Institute which later on was renamed as Kurchatov Institute. He worked there till 1962 and between that year and 1958 also worked at the Niels Bohr Institute in Copenhagen. That year Belyaev generalized Nikolay Bogolyubov's theory of the weakly interacting Bose gas using quantum field theory.

In 1962 he decided to change his lifestyle a bit; he moved to Siberia and in 1968 was elected as a full member of Russian Academy of Sciences. He worked at the Budker Institute of Nuclear Physics. For his breakthroughs and research in physics he was awarded the Landau Gold Medal in 1998 and the Feenberg medal in 2004.

On May 17, 2011, he and Gerard 't Hooft were awarded a Lomonosov Gold Medal by the Russian Academy of Sciences.
