= Gurov =

Gurov (Russian: Гуров) is a Russian masculine surname, its feminine counterpart is Gurova. Notable people with the surname include:

- Alexander Gurov (politician) (born 1945), Russian politician
- Alexander Gurov (boxer) (born 1971), Ukrainian cruiserweight boxer
- Andrey Gurov (sport shooter) (born 1975), Kazakhstani sport shooter
- Anna Gurova (born 1981), Russian sprinter
- Kirill Gurov (1918–1994), Russian theoretical physicist
- Maria Gurova (born 1989), Russian freestyle wrestler
- Maxim Gourov (born 1979), Kazakhstani road bicycle racer
- Natalya Gurova (born 1976), Kazakhstani sports shooter
- Viktoriya Valyukevich (née Gurova in 1982), Russian triple jumper

== See also ==
- Gyurov
- Gjurov
