= Răzvan Marc =

Romanian television presenter

Răzvan Marc is a Romanian international TV presenter and a travel magazine columnist.

== Biography ==
His career in the international media started in 1997 with an internship at MTV Europe in London, learning the rough way the secrets of television. Following this he has been offered a job as a marketing manager at EMI Music Romania to lead and coordinate the implementation of media strategies for international artists in Romania and for Romanian artists around the globe (he was in charge of making O-zone's "Dragostea din Tei" one of the biggest global hits in 2004–2005). At EMI Music Romania he led the team in charge of drafting/issuing press releases and developing collaborations worldwide for international music artists listed in Romania as well as for Romanian artists launched internationally.

Since 2005 he has had significant activities in the media sector, as chief editor of a top travel magazine in Romania and as the presenter of Romania's award winning top rated international travel show Bazar on channel TVR 2 from Romanian Television. Bazar show has celebrated its 100th edition in June 2010.

In 2007–2009 he was given the opportunity to work at the European Parliament (commuting between Brussels and various locations across the world to shoot for his TV show) as a communication officer for the Vice-President of the Liberals (ALDE) in the European Parliament.

In 2010 he started to report for CNN International on Romanian stories and events. Also, since March 2010 he writes a weekly travel column in the nationwide daily România Liberă.

Building on the success of his TV show, Roton, Romania's number one record label, released two DVDs with documentaries presented by Marc: "Subzero - an insight into the arctic Finland" and "Turkey's Aegean Coast" – both best sellers.

2010 saw the release of Răzvan Marc's highly anticipated first travel book: "Austria – a different kind of holiday".

Răzvan Marc has studied English and Italian language and literature at university in Romania and also graduated the creative writing course at the Paris American Academy.

He speaks fluently several languages and likes to keep up to date with what it's happening around the globe in the field of politics, economics, tourism and aviation industry. He is married and currently resides in Bucharest.
