= Bogoliubov causality condition =

S-matrix causality condition

Bogoliubov causality condition is a causality condition for scattering matrix (S-matrix) in axiomatic quantum field theory. The condition was introduced in axiomatic quantum field theory by Nikolay Bogolyubov in 1955.

== Formulation ==
In axiomatic quantum theory, S-matrix is considered as a functional of a function $g: M\to [0,1]$ defined on the Minkowski space $M$. This function characterizes the intensity of the interaction in different space-time regions: the value $g(x)=0$ at a point $x$ corresponds to the absence of interaction in $x$, $g(x)=1$ corresponds to the most intense interaction, and values between 0 and 1 correspond to incomplete interaction at $x$. For two points $x,y\in M$, the notation $x\le y$ means that $x$ causally precedes $y$.

Let $S(g)$ be scattering matrix as a functional of $g$.
The Bogoliubov causality condition in terms of variational derivatives has the form:

$$\frac{\delta}{\delta g(x)}\left(\frac{\delta S(g)}{\delta g(y)} S^\dagger(g)\right)=0 \mbox{ for } x\le y.$$
