= Bogoliubov–Parasyuk theorem =

Theorem of quantum field theory

The Bogoliubov–Parasyuk theorem in quantum field theory states that renormalized Green's functions and matrix elements of the scattering matrix (S-matrix) are free of ultraviolet divergencies. Green's functions and scattering matrix are the fundamental objects in quantum field theory which determine basic physically measurable quantities. Formal expressions for Green's functions and S-matrix in any physical quantum field theory contain divergent integrals (i.e., integrals which take infinite values) and therefore formally these expressions are meaningless. The renormalization procedure is a specific procedure to make these divergent integrals finite and obtain (and predict) finite values for physically measurable quantities. The Bogoliubov–Parasyuk theorem states that for a wide class of quantum field theories, called renormalizable field theories, these divergent integrals can be made finite in a regular way using a finite (and small) set of certain elementary subtractions of divergencies.

The theorem guarantees that computed within the perturbation expansion Green's functions and matrix elements of the scattering matrix are finite for any renormalized quantum field theory. The theorem specifies a concrete procedure (the Bogoliubov–Parasyuk R-operation) for subtraction of divergences in any order of perturbation theory, establishes correctness of this procedure, and guarantees the uniqueness of the obtained results.

The theorem was proved by Nikolay Bogoliubov and Ostap Parasyuk in 1955. The proof of the Bogoliubov–Parasyuk theorem was simplified later.

== See also ==
- Renormalization
- Krylov–Bogolyubov theorem on the existence of invariant measures in dynamics
