= Sergei Tyablikov =

Soviet theoretical physicist (1921-1968)

- Born: 7 September 1921; Klin, Russian SFSR
- Died: 17 March 1968 (aged 46); Moscow, Russian SFSR
- Education: Moscow State University
- Known for: significant contribution to quantum theory of ferromagnetism and antiferromagnetism; development of the double-time Green function's formalism
- Scientific career
- Fields: Statistical mechanics, solid-state physics
- Workplaces: Steklov Institute of Mathematics
- Doctoral advisor: Nikolay Bogolyubov

Sergei Vladimirovich Tyablikov (Russian: Серге́й Влади́мирович Тя́бликов; 7 September 1921 – 17 March 1968) was a Soviet theoretical physicist known for his significant contributions to statistical mechanics, solid-state physics, and for the development of the double-time Green function's formalism.

== Biography ==
Tyablikov was born in Klin, Russia. In 1944 he graduated from the Faculty of Physics at the Moscow State University (MSU) and started his postgraduate study with Anatoly Vlasov and later with Nikolay Bogoliubov at the Department of Theoretical Physics. In 1947 he obtained PhD degree (Candidate of Sciences) with PhD Thesis on the subject of crystallization theory and was appointed to the Steklov Institute of Mathematics, where he continued to work for the rest of his life.

In 1954 he defended at the MSU his doctoral dissertation "Studies of the Polaron Theory" and obtained the degree of Doktor nauk (Doctor of Science, similar to Habilitation). Since 1962 he was the Head of the Division of Statistical Mechanics in the Steklov Institute of Mathematics.

In the period 1966–1968, Sergei Tyablikov also worked at the Joint Institute for Nuclear Research, where he was the first Head of the Statistical Mechanics and Theory of Condensed Matter Group at the Laboratory of Theoretical Physics.

== Research work ==
During postgraduate study in 1944–1947 he worked on theory of crystallization, where he applied such methods as diagonalization of bilinear forms in Bose or Fermi operators, etc., which later became a common tool for theoretical physicists.

After finishing PhD he started to work on the problem of a particle interacting with a quantum field. This problem is directly related to polaron theory, the effect of impurities on the energy spectrum of superfluids, and other problems in condensed matter physics. He was involved in the development of operator form of perturbation theory, approximate second quantization, adiabatic approximation for systems with translational invariance, and other theoretical physics methods which play an important role in the theory of many-particle systems.

Since 1948 in collaboration with Nikolay Bogoliubov he started to work on quantum theory of ferromagnetism and antiferromagnetism. In 1948 they developed a consistent theoretical polar model of metals. Later Tyablikov developed the first consistent quantum theory of magnetic anisotropy.

His particularly important contribution to antiferromagnetism was in the development of the method of quantum temperature Green's functions. In 1959, Sergei Tyablikov and Nikolay Bogoliubov published the paper which strongly influenced the development of the many-body physics and specifically the quantum theory of magnetism. He also co-authored with V.L. Bonch-Bruevich the book The Green Function Method in Statistical Mechanics, the first book with a consistent exposition of the method of Green's functions.

== Publications ==
=== Books ===
1. Bonch-Bruevich V. L., Tyablikov S. V. (1962): The Green Function Method in Statistical Mechanics. North Holland Publishing Co.
2. Tyablikov S. V. (1995): Methods in the Quantum Theory of Magnetism. (Translated to English) Springer; 1st edition. ISBN 0306302632. ISBN 9780306302633.
