= Nikolay Krylov (mathematician, born 1879) =

Russian and Soviet mathematician

- Born: Nikolay Mitrofanovich Krylov; 29 November [O.S. 17 November] 1879; Saint Petersburg, Russian Empire
- Died: May 11, 1955 (aged 75); Moscow, Soviet Union
- Citizenship: Russian Empire; USSR
- Education: Saint Petersburg Mining Institute
- Known for: Krylov–Bogolyubov theorem Krylov–Bogoliubov averaging method
- Scientific career
- Fields: Mathematics
- Academic advisors: Ivan Petrovich Dolbnya
- Doctoral students: Nikolay Bogolyubov

Nikolay Mitrofanovich Krylov (Russian: Никола́й Митрофа́нович Крыло́в, Ukrainian: Мико́ла Митрофа́нович Крило́в; 29 November [O.S. 17 November] 1879 – May 11, 1955) was a Russian and Soviet mathematician known for works on interpolation, non-linear mechanics, and numerical methods for solving equations of mathematical physics.

== Biography ==
Nikolay Krylov graduated from St. Petersburg State Mining Institute in 1902. In the period from 1912 until 1917, he held the Professor position in this institute. In 1917, he went to the Crimea to become Professor at the Crimea University. He worked there until 1922 and then moved to Kyiv to become chairman of the mathematical physics department at the Ukrainian Academy of Sciences.

Nikolay Krylov was a member of the Société mathématique de France and the American Mathematical Society.

== Research ==
Nikolay Krylov developed new methods for analysis of equations of mathematical physics, which can be used not only for proving the existence of solutions but also for their construction. Since 1932, he worked together with his student Nikolay Bogolyubov on mathematical problems of non-linear mechanics. In this period, they invented certain asymptotic methods for integration of non-linear differential equations, studied dynamical systems, and made significant contributions to the foundations of non-linear mechanics. They proved the first theorems on existence of invariant measures known as Krylov–Bogolyubov theorems, introduced the Krylov–Bogoliubov averaging method and, together with Yurii Mitropolskiy, developed the Krylov–Bogoliubov–Mitropolskiy asymptotic method for approximate solving equations of non-linear mechanics.

== Doctoral students ==
- Nikolay Bogolyubov

== Publications ==
Nikolay Krylov published over 200 papers on analysis and mathematical physics and two monographs:

- Nicolas Kryloff (1931): Les Méthodes de Solution Approchée des Problèmes de la Physique Mathématique. Paris: Gauthier-Villars [in French].
- N. M. Krylov, N. N. Bogoliubov (1947): Introduction to Nonlinear Mechanics. Princeton: Princeton University Press. ISBN 978-0-691-07985-1.

== See also ==
- Describing function
- Krylov–Bogolyubov theorem
- Krylov–Bogoliubov averaging method
- Krylov–Bogolyubov–Mitropolskiy asymptotic method
