= Kerson Huang =

Chinese physicist (1928–2016)

Kerson Huang (Chinese: 黃克孫; pinyin: Huáng Kèsūn; 15 March 1928 – 1 September 2016) was a Chinese-born American theoretical physicist and translator.

== Early life and education ==
Huang was born in Nanning, China and grew up in Manila, Philippines. He earned a B.S. and a Ph.D. in physics from the Massachusetts Institute of Technology (MIT) in 1950 and 1953, respectively.

== Career ==
He served as an instructor at MIT from 1953 to 1955, and subsequently spent two years as a fellow at the Institute for Advanced Study. After returning to the MIT faculty in 1957, Huang became an authority on statistical physics, and worked on Bose–Einstein condensation and quantum field theory. At MIT, he had many PhD students in theoretical physics including Raymond G. Vickson who became a professor in Operations Research at the University of Waterloo. After retiring in 1999, he wrote on biophysics and was also a visiting professor at Nanyang Technological University in Singapore.

In a 1957 paper, T. D. Lee, Huang, and C. N. Yang introduced the Lee–Huang–Yang correction on Bose–Einstein condensate systems.

== Translation ==
Huang was best known to Chinese readers as the translator of the Rubaiyat of Omar Khayyam; while a graduate student in physics, he adapted Edward FitzGerald's famous adaptation into Classical Chinese verse. The book (Chinese: 魯拜集) had been out of print for years, but was reprinted in Taiwan in 1989. With his wife Rosemary, Huang also translated the ancient divination text I Ching into English.

== Death ==
Huang died on 1 September 2016 at the age of 88.

== Books ==
- 2016. A Superfluid Universe. Singapore: World Scientific Publishing. ISBN 978-981-3148-45-1
- 2014. Huang, Kerson (2014). I Ching: The Oracle (Revised ed.). Hackensack, New Jersey: World Scientific. p. 208. doi:10.1142/8891. ISBN 978-981-4522-60-1.
- 2007. Fundamental Forces of Nature: The Story of Gauge Fields. World Scientific. Aimed at educated lay readers.
- 2005. Lectures on Statistical Physics and Protein Folding. World Scientific. ISBN 981-256-143-9
- 2001. Introduction to Statistical Physics. Taylor & Francis. ISBN 0-7484-0941-6
- 1998. Quantum Field Theory: From Operators to Path Integrals. John Wiley & Sons. ISBN 0-471-14120-8; 2nd revised and enlarged edition, 2010
- 1992. Quarks, Leptons and Gauge Fields, 2nd ed. World Scientific. ISBN 981-02-0659-3
- 1987. Statistical Mechanics, 2nd ed. John Wiley & Sons.
- 1984. I Ching, the Oracle. World Scientific. ISBN 9971-966-25-5
