= Krylov–Bogoliubov averaging method =

The Krylov–Bogolyubov averaging method (Krylov–Bogolyubov method of averaging) is a mathematical method for approximate analysis of oscillating processes in non-linear mechanics. The method is based on the averaging principle when the exact differential equation of the motion is replaced by its averaged version. The method is named after Nikolay Krylov and Nikolay Bogoliubov.

Various averaging schemes for studying problems of celestial mechanics were used since works of Carl Friederich Gauss, Pierre Fatou, Boris Delone and George William Hill. The importance of the contribution of Krylov and Bogoliubov is that they developed a general averaging approach and proved that the solution of the averaged system approximates the exact dynamics.

== Background ==
Krylov–Bogoliubov averaging can be used to approximate oscillatory problems when a classical perturbation expansion fails. That is singular perturbation problems of oscillatory type, for example Einstein's correction to the perihelion precession of Mercury.

== Derivation ==
The method deals with differential equations in the form

$$\frac{d^2u}{dt^2} + k^2 u = a + \varepsilon f\left(u,\frac{du}{dt}\right)$$

for a smooth function f along with appropriate initial conditions. The parameter ε is assumed to satisfy

$$0 < \varepsilon \ll k.$$

If ε = 0 then the equation becomes that of the simple harmonic oscillator with constant forcing, and the general solution is

$$u(t) = \frac{a}{k^2} + A \sin (kt + B),$$

where A and B are chosen to match the initial conditions. The solution to the perturbed equation (when ε ≠ 0) is assumed to take the same form, but now A and B are allowed to vary with t (and ε). If it is also assumed that

$$\frac{du}{dt} = kA(t) \cos (kt + B(t)),$$

then it can be shown that A and B satisfy the differential equation:

$$\frac{d}{dt} \begin{bmatrix} A \\ B \end{bmatrix}  = \frac{\varepsilon}{k} f\left( \frac{a}{k^2} + A \sin (\phi), kA \cos (\phi)\right) \begin{bmatrix} \cos(\phi)  \\ - \frac{1}{A} \sin(\phi)  \end{bmatrix},$$

where $\phi = kt + B$. Note that this equation is still exact — no approximation has been made as yet. The method of Krylov and Bogolyubov is to note that the functions A and B vary slowly with time (in proportion to ε), so their dependence on $\phi$ can be (approximately) removed by averaging on the right hand side of the previous equation:

$$\frac{d}{dt} \begin{bmatrix} A_0 \\ B_0 \end{bmatrix}  = \frac{\varepsilon}{2\pi k} \int_0^{2 \pi} f\left( \frac{a}{k^2} + A_0 \sin (\theta), kA_0\cos (\theta)\right) \begin{bmatrix} \cos(\theta)  \\ - \frac{1}{A_0} \sin(\theta)  \end{bmatrix} d\theta,$$

where $A_0$ and $B_0$ are held fixed during the integration. After solving this (possibly) simpler set of differential equations, the Krylov–Bogolyubov averaged approximation for the original function is then given by

$$u_0(t,\varepsilon) := \frac{a}{k^2} + A_0(t,\varepsilon) \sin (kt + B_0(t,\varepsilon)).$$

This approximation has been shown to satisfy

$$\left| u(t,\varepsilon) - u_0(t,\varepsilon) \right| \le C_1 \varepsilon,$$

where t satisfies

$$0 \le t \le \frac{C_2}{\varepsilon}$$

for some constants $C_1$ and $C_2$, independent of ε.
