= Medal "In Commemoration of the 250th Anniversary of Leningrad" =

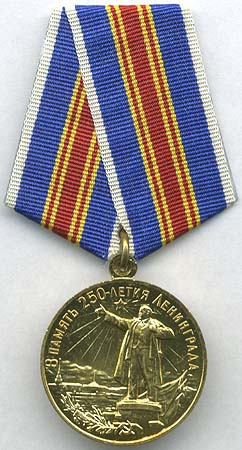
- Medal "In Commemoration of the 250th Anniversary of Leningrad" (obverse)
- Type: Commemorative medal
- Awarded for: Wartime and peacetime service to the city of Leningrad
- Presented by: USSR
- Eligibility: Citizens of the Soviet Union
- Status: No longer awarded
- Established: May 16, 1957

Highlights
- Total: 1,445,900
- Ribbon of the Medal "In Commemoration of the 250th Anniversary of Leningrad"

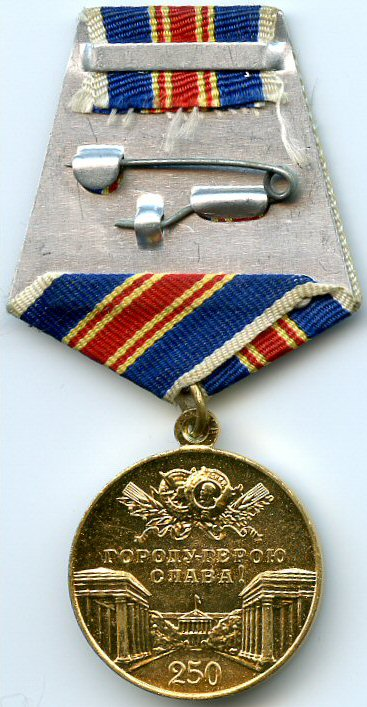
Reverse of the Medal "In Commemoration of the 250th Anniversary of Leningrad"

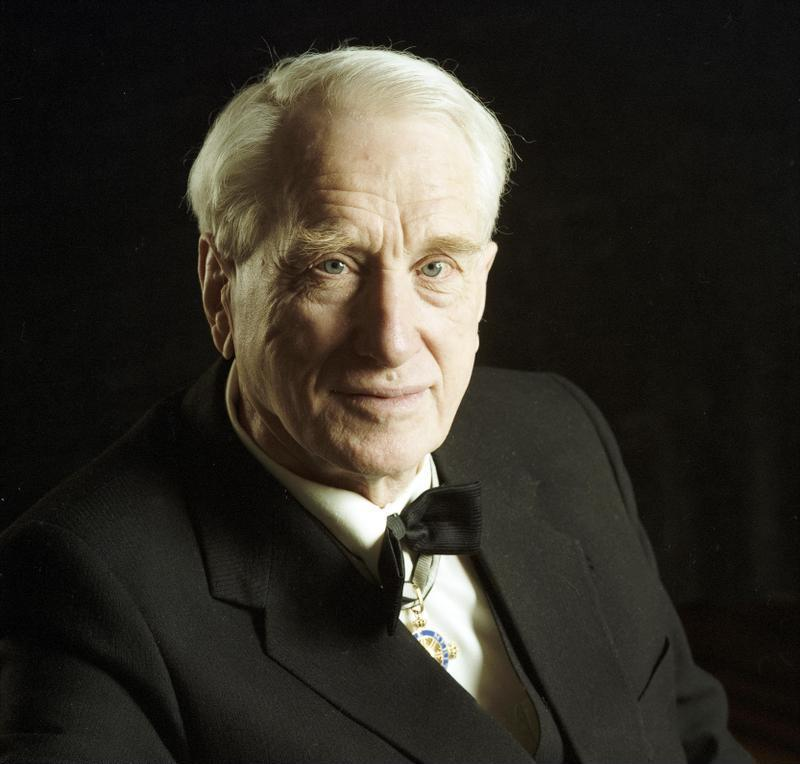
Boris Piotrovsky, a recipient of the Medal "In Commemoration of the 250th Anniversary of Leningrad"

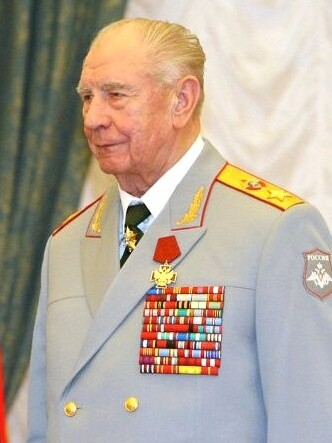
Dmitry Yazov, a recipient of the Medal "In Commemoration of the 250th Anniversary of Leningrad"

The Medal "In Commemoration of the 250th Anniversary of Leningrad" (Russian: Медаль «В память 250-летия Ленинграда») was a state commemorative medal of the Soviet Union established by decree of the Presidium of the Supreme Soviet of the USSR on May 16, 1957 to commemorate the 250th anniversary of the city of Leningrad. It was awarded to prominent members of Soviet society including veterans of the Great Patriotic War and serving members of the armed forces for wartime and peacetime services to the Hero-City of Leningrad.

== Medal Statute ==
The Medal "In Commemoration of the 250th Anniversary of Leningrad" was awarded to: workers, technicians and employees of industrial enterprises, transportation and urban development of Leningrad; to people working in science, technology, the arts, literature, education and health; to employees of state institutions, party, trade unions, Komsomol and other public organizations; who distinguished themselves in working in the reconstruction of the city and ensured the development of its own labour in industry, transportation, urban development, and in academic and cultural institutions; to soldiers and pensioners, to war or labour related invalids; to housewives who took an active part in the improvement of the city and in the work of schools and childcare facilities. Award was conditional to having resided in the city of Leningrad or its suburbs for a minimum of 5 years.

The Medal "In Commemoration of the 250th Anniversary of Leningrad" was awarded on behalf of the Presidium of the Supreme Soviet of the USSR by the Executive Committee of the Council of People's Deputies of the City of Leningrad.

It was worn on the left side of the chest and in the presence of other orders and medals of the USSR, immediately after the Medal "In Commemoration of the 800th Anniversary of Moscow". When worn in the presence of Orders or medals of the Russian Federation, the latter have precedence.

== Medal description ==
The Medal "In Commemoration of the 250th Anniversary of Leningrad" was a 32mm in diameter gilt circular medal designed by NA Sokolov. On the obverse in relief, the Lenin Monument at the Finlyandsky Rail Terminal with the Neva River and Russian Admiralty in the background. Below Lenin, the image of the hammer and sickle with a laurel branch at its left and unfolded banners at its right. Above Lenin's outstretched arm, a five-pointed star with radiating beams. At the top, along the circumference of the medal, the inscription "In Commemoration of the 250th Anniversary of Leningrad" (Russian: «В память 250-летия Ленинграда». On the reverse, the Smolny Institute, just below the building, the number "250". At the top, within a wreath of oak and laurel branches, the Order of Lenin and the Order of the Red Banner, below the orders, the inscription "GLORY TO THE HERO-CITY!" (Russian: «ГОРОДУ-ГЕРОЮ СЛАВА!»).

The medal was secured to a standard Russian pentagonal mount by a ring through the medal suspension loop. The mount was covered by a 24 mm wide silk moiré blue ribbon with 2 mm white edge stripes and a central 4 mm red stripe flanked by three 1 mm yellow, red and yellow stripes.

== Recipients (partial list) ==
The individuals listed below were recipients of the Medal "In Commemoration of the 250th Anniversary of Leningrad".

- Marshal of the Soviet Union Georgy Konstantinovich Zhukov
- Marshal of the Soviet Union Dmitriy Feodorovich Ustinov
- Marshal of the Soviet Union Sergey Fyodorovich Akhromeyev
- Marshal of the Soviet Union Kirill Afanasievich Meretskov
- Dancer and choreographer Yury Nikolayevich Grigorovich
- Marshal of the Soviet Union Petr Kirillovich Koshevoi
- Army General Ivan Ivanovich Fedyuninsky
- Admiral of the Fleet Hovhannes Stepani Isakov
- Captain 1st grade Ivan Vasilyevich Travkin
- Marshal of the Soviet Union Semyon Mikhailovich Budyonny
- Lieutenant General Alexander Ignatyevich Molodchy
- People's Artist of the USSR Georgiy Stepanovich Zhzhonov
- General Secretary of the Central Committee of the Communist Party of the Soviet Union Leonid Ilyich Brezhnev
- Mathematician and physicist Vasilii Sergeevich Vladimirov
- Biophysicist Mikhail Vladimirovich Volkenshtein
- Chief Marshal of Artillery Nikolay Nikolayevich Voronov
- Admiral of the Fleet of the Soviet Union Sergey Georgiyevich Gorshkov
- Major Alexander Ivanovich Marinesko
- Chief Marshal of Aviation Alexander Alexandrovich Novikov
- Academician, historian-orientalist and archaeologist Boris Borisovich Piotrovsky
- Geologist and politician Marina Yevgenyevna Salye
- Marshal of the Soviet Union Dmitry Timofeyevich Yazov
- Physicist Yuri Andreevich Yappa

== See also ==
- Hero-City
- Leningrad
- Siege of Leningrad
- Awards and decorations of the Russian Federation
- Awards and decorations of the Soviet Union
- Medal "In Commemoration of the 300th Anniversary of Saint Petersburg"
