= Gyurov =

Gyurov (Bulgarian: Гюров) is a Bulgarian masculine surname, its feminine counterpart is Gyurova. Notable people with the surname include:

- Andrey Gurov (born 1975), Bulgarian politician
- Ginka Gyurova (born 1954), Bulgarian rower
- Krasimira Gyurova (1953–2011), Bulgarian basketball player
- Spas Gyurov (born 1986), Bulgarian road bicycle racer

== See also ==
- Gurov
- Gjurov
