= Bogoliubov inner product =

Special inner product in the space of operators

The Bogoliubov inner product (also known as the Duhamel two-point function, Bogolyubov inner product, Bogoliubov scalar product, or Kubo–Mori–Bogoliubov inner product) is a special inner product in the space of operators. The Bogoliubov inner product appears in quantum statistical mechanics and is named after theoretical physicist Nikolay Bogoliubov.

== Definition ==
Let $A$ be a nonnegative self-adjoint operator. The Bogoliubov inner product of any two operators X and Y is defined as

$$\langle X,Y\rangle_A=\int\limits_0^1 {\rm Tr}[ {\rm e}^{-xA} X^\dagger{\rm e}^{-(1-x)A}Y]dx$$

The Bogoliubov inner product satisfies all the axioms of the inner product: it is sesquilinear, positive semidefinite (i.e., $\langle X,X\rangle_A\ge 0$), and satisfies the symmetry property $\langle X,Y\rangle_A=(\langle Y,X\rangle_A)^*$ where $\alpha^*$ is the complex conjugate of $\alpha$.

In applications to quantum statistical mechanics, the operator $A$ has the form $A=\beta H$, where $H$ is the Hamiltonian of the quantum system and $\beta$ is the inverse temperature. With these choices of notation, the Bogoliubov inner product takes the form

$$\langle X,Y\rangle_{\beta H}= \int\limits_0^1 {\rm Tr}[ {\rm e}^{-x\beta H} X^\dagger{\rm e}^{-(1-x)\beta H}Y ] dx$$

resembling a thermal average $\langle A\rangle = {\rm Tr}[\rho A]$, where $\rho = {\rm e}^{-\beta H} / {\rm Tr}[{\rm e}^{-\beta H}]$. In terms of the partition function, or statistical sum, this average is

$$\frac{\partial}{\partial s} \ln Z(s)\big|_{s=0} = -\beta\langle A\rangle$$

where $\tilde\rho_s = {\rm e}^{-\beta (H + s A)} / {\rm Tr}[{\rm e}^{-\beta (H + s A)}]$ represents a perturbation of $H$ by $A$, and $\tilde\rho_0 = \rho$.

In quantum statistical mechanics, the Bogoliubov inner product appears as the second order term in the expansion of the statistical sum:

$$\langle X,Y\rangle_{\beta H}=\frac{\partial^2}{\partial t\partial s}{\rm Tr}\,{\rm e}^{\beta H+tX+sY} \bigg\vert_{t=s=0}$$
