= Dmitry Zubarev =

- Born: 27 November 1917; Moscow, Russian SFSR
- Died: 29 July 1992 (aged 74); Moscow, Russia
- Education: Moscow State University
- Known for: significant contribution to non-equilibrium thermodynamics and to the double-time Green function's formalism
- Scientific career
- Fields: Statistical mechanics
- Workplaces: Arzamas-16; Steklov Institute of Mathematics
- Doctoral advisor: Nikolay Bogolyubov
- Doctoral students: Alexander Kuzemsky

Dmitry Nikolayevich Zubarev (Russian: Дми́трий Никола́евич Зу́барев; 27 November 1917 – 29 July 1992) was a Soviet and Russian theoretical physicist known for his contributions to statistical mechanics, non-equilibrium thermodynamics, plasma physics, theory of turbulence, and to the development of the double-time Green function's formalism.

== Biography ==
Dmitry Zubarev was born in Moscow in the family of an engineer. In 1941, he graduated from the Physics Department at Moscow State University and soon after that, on 25 June 1941, volunteered to the People's Volunteer Corps to participate in the Second World War. He participated in the Battle of Moscow and met the end of the war in Berlin with the 47th Army of the 1st Belorussian Front.

After the war he worked for several years on various military related research projects in Arzamas-16. In this period of time he was greatly influenced by Nikolay Bogolyubov and Andrei Sakharov. Then, in 1954 he moved to the Steklov Institute of Mathematics, where he continued to work for the rest of his life.

== Research work ==
His first research in Arzamas-16 was devoted to various applications of plasma theory, including analysis of stationary regimes for nuclear reactors (jointly with V. N. Klimov) and analysis of temperature jumps of plasma in magnetic field.

After that he started to work in collaboration with Nikolay Bogolyubov on various problems in theoretical physics and obtained several fundamental results, including development of an asymptotic method for systems with rapidly rotating phases, development of the method of collective variables which is now widely used in theoretical physics, and development of the microscopic theory of superfluidity.

He made a significant contribution to the theory of double-time temperature Green's functions in statistical mechanics, where his work became world-famous.

In the period 1961—1965, he developed a method of non-equilibrium statistical operator (NSO), which is now a classical tool in the statistical theory of non-equilibrium processes. This method allowed him to include non-equilibrium phenomena in the framework of statistical mechanics in a natural way following the ideas of Josiah Willard Gibbs. Using the NSO method, he constructed relativistic thermodynamics and relativistic hydrodynamics, the statistical transport theory for systems of particles with internal degrees of freedom, and the statistical thermodynamics for turbulent transport processes.

Zubarev was an editorial staff member of the journal Theoretical and Mathematical Physics and a member of the International Editorial staff of the journals Physica A and Physics Letters A.

== Publications ==
=== Books ===
1. Zubarev D. N. (1974): Nonequilibrium Statistical Thermodynamics (Originally published in Russian by Nauka, Moscow in 1971, and translated to English, German, Japanese, and Polish languages). New York, Consultants Bureau. ISBN 0-306-10895-X; ISBN 978-0-306-10895-2.
2. Zubarev D. N., Morozov V., Ropke G. (1996): Statistical Mechanics of Nonequilibrium Processes: Basic Concepts, Kinetic Theory. John Wiley & Sons. ISBN 3-05-501708-0.
3. Zubarev D. N., Morozov V., Ropke G. (1997): Statistical Mechanics of Nonequilibrium Processes: Relaxation and Hydrodynamic Processes. John Wiley & Sons. ISBN 3-527-40084-2.

== See also ==
- Non-equilibrium statistical operator
