= Vasily Vladimirov =

Russian mathematician (1923–2012)

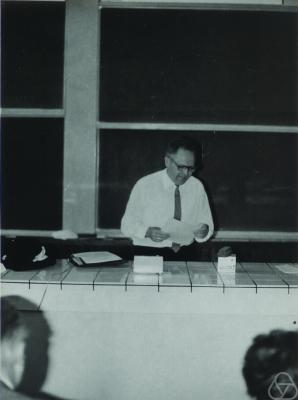
- Vladimirov in Nice, 1970
- Born: Vasily Sergeyevich Vladimirov; 9 January 1923; Dyaglevo, Novoladozhsky Uyezd, Saint Petersburg Governorate, RSFSR, Soviet Union
- Died: 3 November 2012 (aged 89); Odintsovsky District, Moscow Oblast, Russia
- Education: Leningrad State University (now Saint Petersburg State University) 1959
- Known for: number theory, mathematical physics, quantum field theory, numerical analysis, generalized functions, several complex variables, p-adic analysis, multidimensional tauberian theorems
- Awards: Stalin prize 1953, Lyapunov Gold Medal of the Russian Academy of Sciences 1971, USSR State Prize 1987
- Scientific career
- Fields: Mathematics and mathematical physics
- Workplaces: Leningrad State University (now Saint Petersburg State University) Steklov Institute of Mathematics
- Doctoral advisor: Nikolay Bogolyubov
- Other academic advisors: Boris Venkov, Leonid Kantorovich

Vasily Sergeyevich Vladimirov (Russian: Васи́лий Серге́евич Влади́миров; 9 January 1923 – 3 November 2012) was a Soviet and Russian mathematician working in the fields of number theory, mathematical physics, quantum field theory, numerical analysis, generalized functions, several complex variables, p-adic analysis, multidimensional Tauberian theorems.

== Life ==
Vladimirov was born to a peasant family of 5 children, in 1923, Petrograd. Under the impact of food shortage and poverty, he began schooling in 1930. He then went to a 7-year school in 1934, but transferred to the Leningrad Technical School of Hydrology and Meteorology in 1937. In 1939, at the age of sixteen, he enrolled into a night preparatory school for workers, and finally successfully progressed to Leningrad University to study physics.

During the Second World War, Vladimirov took part in defence of Leningrad against German invasion, building defences, working as a tractor driver and as meteorologist in Air Force after training. He served in several different units, mainly as part of air-defense system of Leningrad. He was given the rank of sergeant major in the reserves after the war and permitted to return to his study.

When he returned to university, Vladimirov shifted his focus of interest from physics to number theory. Under the advice of Boris Alekseevich Venkov (1900-1962), an expert on quadratic forms, he started undertaking research in number theory and attained a master's degree in 1948. In the first thesis of his master study in Leningrad, he confirmed the existence of non-extreme perfect quadratic form in six variables in Georgy Fedoseevich Voronoy's conjecture. In his second thesis, he approached packing problems for convex bodies initiated by Hermann Minkowski. Upon graduation, he was appointed as a junior researcher in the Leningrad Branch of the Steklov Mathematical Institute of the USSR Academy of Sciences.

As the Soviet atomic bomb programme ran, Vladimirov was assigned to assist with the development of the bomb, in joint force with many top scientists and industrialists. He worked with Vitalevich Kantorovich calculating critical parameters of certain simple nuclear systems. In 1950, when he was sent to Arzamas-16, he worked under the direction of Nikolai Nikolaevich Bogolyubov, who later became a long-term collaborator with Vladimirov. In Arzamas-16, Vladimirov worked on finding mathematical solutions for problems raised by physicists. He developed new techniques for the numerical solution of boundary value problems, especially for solving the kinetic equation of neutron transfer in nuclear reactors in 1952, which is now known as Vladimirov method.

After the success of the bomb project, Vladimirov was awarded the Stalin Prize in for his contribution 1953. He continued working on mathematics for atomic bomb in the Central Scientific Research Institute for Artillery Armaments, where he served as Senior Researcher in 1955. Vladimirov moved to Steklov Mathematical Institute, Moscow, in 1956, under the supervision of Nikolay Nikolaevich Bogolyubov. There he started working on new mathematical branches for solving problems in quantum field theory. He defended his doctoral thesis in 1958, which contains the renowned 'Vladimirov variational principle'.

== Honours and awards ==
- Hero of Socialist Labour
- Two Orders of Lenin
- Order of the Patriotic War 2nd class
- Two Orders of the Red Banner of Labour
- Medal of Zhukov
- Medal "For the Defence of Leningrad"
- Medal "For the Victory over Germany in the Great Patriotic War 1941–1945"
- Jubilee Medal "Twenty Years of Victory in the Great Patriotic War 1941–1945"
- Jubilee Medal "Thirty Years of Victory in the Great Patriotic War 1941–1945"
- Jubilee Medal "Forty Years of Victory in the Great Patriotic War 1941–1945"
- Jubilee Medal "50 Years of Victory in the Great Patriotic War 1941–1945"
- Jubilee Medal "60 Years of Victory in the Great Patriotic War 1941–1945"
- Jubilee Medal "50 Years of the Armed Forces of the USSR"
- Jubilee Medal "60 Years of the Armed Forces of the USSR"
- Jubilee Medal "70 Years of the Armed Forces of the USSR"
- Medal "In Commemoration of the 250th Anniversary of Leningrad"
- Medal "Veteran of Labour"
- Medal "In Commemoration of the 850th Anniversary of Moscow"
- Medal "In Commemoration of the 300th Anniversary of Saint Petersburg"
- Stalin Prize
- USSR State Prize

== Selected publications ==
- Vladimirov, V. S. (1966), Ehrenpreis, L. (ed.), Methods of the theory of functions of several complex variables. With a foreword of N.N. Bogolyubov, Cambridge-London: The M.I.T. Press, pp. XII+353, MR 0201669, Zbl 0125.31904 (Zentralblatt review of the original Russian edition). One of the first modern monographs on the theory of several complex variables, being different from other ones of the same period due to the extensive use of generalized functions.
- Vladimirov, V. S. (1979), Generalized functions in mathematical physics, Moscow: Mir Publishers, p. 362, ISBN 978-0-8285-0001-2, MR 0564116, Zbl 0515.46034. A textbook on the theory of generalized functions and their applications to mathematical physics and several complex variables.
- Vladimirov, V.S. (1983), Equations of mathematical physics (2nd ed.), Moscow: Mir Publishers, p. 464, MR 0764399, Zbl 0207.09101 (Zentralblatt review of the first English edition).
- Vladimirov, V.S.; Drozzinov, Yu.N.; Zavialov, B.I. (1988), Tauberian theorems for generalized functions, Mathematics and Its Applications (Soviet Series), vol. 10, Dordrecht-Boston-London: Kluwer Academic Publishers, pp. XV+293, ISBN 978-90-277-2383-3, MR 0947960, Zbl 0636.40003.
- Vladimirov, V.S. (2002), Methods of the theory of generalized functions, Analytical Methods and Special Functions, vol. 6, London-New York City: Taylor & Francis, pp. XII+353, ISBN 978-0-415-27356-5, MR 2012831, Zbl 1078.46029. A monograph on the theory of generalized functions written with an eye towards their applications to several complex variables and mathematical physics, as is customary for the Author: it is a substantial revision of the textbook (Vladimirov 1979).

== See also ==
- Nikolay Bogolyubov
- Generalized function
- Edge-of-the-wedge theorem
- Riemann–Hilbert problem
