= Nikolay Bogolyubov =

Soviet mathematician and theoretical physicist (1909–1992)

- Николай Боголюбов; Микола Боголюбов
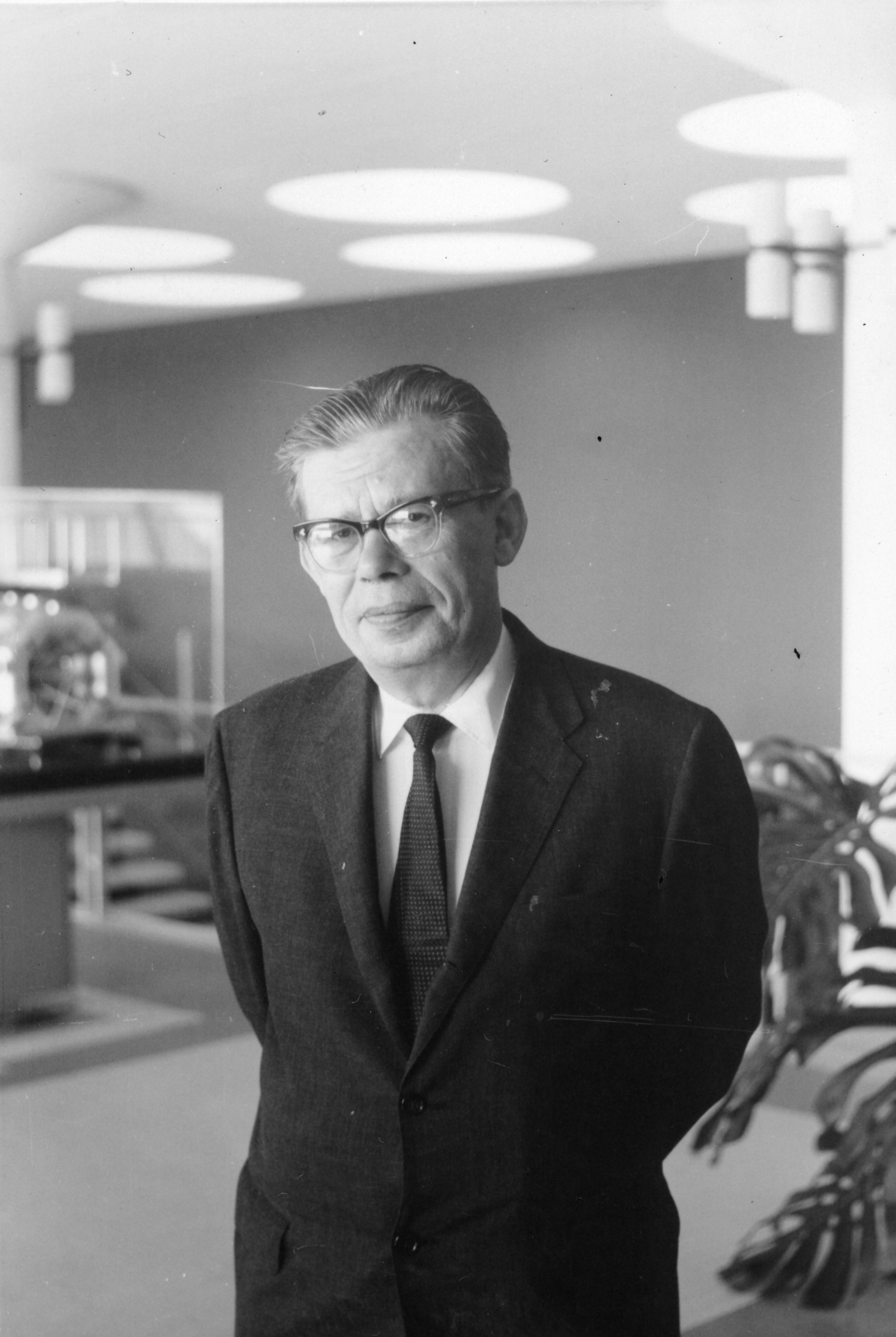
- Born: 21 August 1909; Nizhny Novgorod, Russia
- Died: 13 February 1992 (aged 82); Moscow, Russia
- Other name: Mykola Bogolyubov
- Known for: List: Bogoliubov approximation; Bogoliubov causality condition; Bogolyubov edge-of-the-wedge theorem; Bogolyubov inequality; Bogoliubov inner product; Bogolyubov's lemma; Bogoliubov quasiparticle; Bogoliubov theory for weakly interacting gas; Bogoliubov transformation; Bogoliubov–Parasyuk theorem; BBGKY hierarchy; Krylov-Bogoliubov averaging method; Krylov–Bogolyubov theorem; Peierls–Bogoliubov inequality; Weakly interacting Bose gas
- Honours: Stalin Prize (1947, 1953); USSR State Prize (1984); Lenin Prize (1958); Heineman Prize (1966); Hero of Socialist Labor (1969, 1979); Max Planck Medal (1973); Lomonosov Gold Medal (1985); Dirac Prize (1992)
- Scientific career
- Fields: Theoretical physics, mathematical physics, mathematics
- Workplaces: Kiev University; Steklov Institute of Mathematics; Lomonosov Moscow State University; Joint Institute for Nuclear Research
- Doctoral advisor: Nikolay Krylov
- Doctoral students: Dmitry Zubarev; Yurii Mitropolskiy; Sergei Tyablikov; Dmitry Shirkov

Nikolay Nikolayevich Bogolyubov (Note: Nikolay Nikolayevich is a transliteration from Russian Никола́й Никола́евич Боголю́бов; his name is sometimes written as Mykola Mykolayovych as a transliteration from Ukrainian Микола Миколайович Боголюбов; his last name can also be transliterated as Bogoliubov and Bogolubov.) (21 August 1909 – 13 February 1992) was a Soviet mathematician and theoretical physicist known for his significant contributions to quantum field theory, classical and quantum statistical mechanics, and the theory of dynamical systems; he was the recipient of the 1992 Dirac Medal for his works and studies.

== Biography ==
=== Early life (1909–1921) ===
Nikolay Bogolyubov was born on 21 August 1909 in Nizhny Novgorod, Russia. His father, Nikolay Mikhaylovich Bogolyubov, was a Russian Orthodox priest and a teacher of theology, philosophy, and psychology at the Nizhny Novgorod Theological Seminary. His mother, Olga Nikolayevna, née Lyuminarskaya, was a music teacher.

Six months after Nikolay's birth, the family moved to Nezhin (present-day Ukraine), where his father taught him until 1913.

From 1913 to 1918, the family lived in Kiev. Nikolay was initially homeschooled. His father taught him the basics of arithmetic, as well as German, French, and English. At the age of six, he attended a preparatory class in the Kiev Gymnasium. However, he did not stay in the gymnasium for long, as the family moved to the village of Velyka Krucha. From 1919 to 1921, he studied at the Velykokruchanska seven-year school, which was the only educational institution he graduated from.

=== Kiev period (1921–1940) ===
The family soon moved to Kiev in 1921, where they continued to live in poverty as the elder Nikolay Bogolyubov only found a position as a priest in 1923. After finishing seven years of school, Bogolyubov independently studied physics and mathematics, and by the age of 14, he was already participating in the seminar of the Department of Mathematical Physics at Kiev University under the supervision of academician Dmitry Grave.

In 1924, at the age of 15, Bogolyubov wrote his first published scientific paper On the behavior of solutions of linear differential equations at infinity. In 1925, he entered Ph.D. program at the Academy of Sciences of the Ukrainian SSR under the supervision of the well-known contemporary mathematician Nikolay Krylov and obtained the degree of Candidate of Sciences (equivalent to a Ph.D.) in 1928, at the age of 19, with the doctoral thesis titled On direct methods of variational calculus. In 1930, at the age of 21, he obtained the degree of Doctor of Sciences (equivalent to habilitation), the highest degree in the Soviet Union, which requires the recipient to have made a significant independent contribution to his or her scientific field.

This early period of Bogolyubov's work in science was concerned with such mathematical problems as direct methods of the calculus of variations, the theory of almost periodic functions, methods of approximate solution of differential equations, and dynamical systems. This earlier research had already earned him recognition. One of his essays was awarded the Bologna Academy of Sciences Prize in 1930, and the author was awarded the erudite degree of doctor of mathematics. This was the period when the scientific career of the young Bogolyubov began, later producing new scientific trends in modern mathematics, physics, and mechanics.

Since 1931, Krylov and Bogolyubov worked together on the problems of nonlinear mechanics and nonlinear oscillations. They were the key figures in the Kiev school of nonlinear oscillation research, where their cooperation resulted in the paper "On the quasiperiodic solutions of the equations of nonlinear mechanics" (1934) and the book Introduction to Nonlinear Mechanics (1937; translated to English in 1947), leading to a creation of a large field of non-linear mechanics.

And this can explain, as the authors believe, the need to shape the collection of problems of non-linear perturbation theory into a special science, which could be named NON-LINEAR MECHANICS.

— N. M. Krylov and N. N. Bogolyubov, New methods in non-linear mechanics, ONTI GTTI, Moscow-Leningrad, 1934

Distinctive features of the Kiev school approach included an emphasis on the computation of solutions (not just a proof of its existence), approximations of periodic solutions, the use of the invariant manifolds in the phase space, and applications of a single unified approach to many different problems. From a control engineering point of view, the key achievement of the Kyiv School was the development by Krylov and Bogolyubov of the describing function method for the analysis of nonlinear control problems.

In 1936, Bogolyubov was awarded the title of professor, and from 1936 to 1940, he chaired the Department of Mathematical Physics at Kiev University. In 1939, he was elected a corresponding member of the Academy of Sciences of the Ukrainian SSR. In 1940, after northern Bukovina was annexed to the Ukrainian SSR, Bogolyubov was sent to Chernivtsi to organize mathematical departments at the Faculty of Physics and Mathematics of Chernivtsi State University.

=== Evacuation (1941–1943) ===
Following the German invasion of the Soviet Union on 22 June 1941, most institutes and universities from the western part were evacuated into the eastern regions, far from the battle lines. Bogolyubov moved to Ufa, where he became Head of the Departments of Mathematical Analysis at Ufa State Aviation Technical University and at Ufa Pedagogical Institute, remaining in these positions from July 1941 to August 1943.

=== Moscow (from 1943) ===
In the autumn of 1943, Bogolyubov arrived at Moscow, and on 1 November 1943, he accepted a position in the Department of Theoretical Physics at Moscow State University. At that time, the head of the department was Anatoly Vlasov (for a short period in 1944 the head of the department was Vladimir Fock). Theoretical physicists working in the department in that period included Dmitri Ivanenko, Arseny Sokolov, and others.

From 1943 to 1946, Bogolyubov's research was essentially concerned with the theory of stochastic processes and asymptotic methods. A simple example of an anharmonic oscillator driven by a superposition of incoherent sinusoidal oscillations with continuous spectrum was used to show that depending on a specific approximation time scale the evolution of the system can be either deterministic, or a stochastic process satisfying Fokker–Planck equation, or even a process which is neither deterministic nor stochastic. In other words, he showed that depending on the choice of the time scale for the corresponding approximations the same stochastic process can be regarded as both dynamical and Markovian, and in the general case as a non-Markov process. This work was the first to introduce the notion of time hierarchy in non-equilibrium statistical physics which then became the key concept in all further development of the statistical theory of irreversible processes.

In 1945, Bogolyubov proved a fundamental theorem on the existence and basic properties of a one-parameter integral manifold for a system of non-linear differential equations. He investigated periodic and quasi-periodic solutions lying on a one-dimensional manifold, thus forming the foundation for a new method of non-linear mechanics, the method of integral manifolds.

In 1946, he published two works in the Journal of Experimental and Theoretical Physics on equilibrium and non-equilibrium statistical mechanics which became the essence of his fundamental monograph Problems of dynamical theory in statistical physics (Moscow, 1946).

On 26 January 1953, Bogolyubov became the head of the Department of Theoretical Physics at Moscow State University, after Anatoly Vlasov decided to leave the position on January 2, 1953.

=== Steklov Institute (from 1947) ===
In 1947, Bogolyubov organized and became the head of the Department of Theoretical Physics at the Steklov Institute of Mathematics. In 1969, the Department of Theoretical Physics was separated into the Departments of Mathematical Physics (head: Vasily Vladimirov), of Statistical Mechanics, and of Quantum Field Theory (Head Mikhail Polivanov). While working in the Steklov Institute, Bogolyubov and his school contributed to science with many important works including works on renormalization theory, renormalization group, axiomatic S-matrix theory, and works on the theory of dispersion relations.

In the late 1940s and 1950s, Bogolyubov worked on the theory of superfluidity and superconductivity, where he developed the method of BBGKY hierarchy for a derivation of kinetic equations, formulated microscopic theory of superfluidity, and made other essential contributions. Later he worked on quantum field theory, where introduced the Bogoliubov transformation, formulated and proved the Bogoliubov's edge-of-the-wedge theorem and Bogoliubov–Parasyuk theorem (with Ostap Parasyuk), and obtained other significant results. In the 1960s his attention turned to the quark model of hadrons; in 1965 he was among the first scientists to study the new quantum number color charge.

In 1946, Bogolyubov was elected as a corresponding member of the Academy of Sciences of the Soviet Union. He was elected a full member (academician) of the Academy of Sciences of the Ukrainian SSR and a full member of the Academy of Sciences of the USSR in 1953.

=== Dubna (1956–1992) ===
From 1956, he worked in the Joint Institute for Nuclear Research in Dubna, Russia, where he was a founder (together with Dmitry Blokhintsev) and the first director of the Laboratory of Theoretical Physics. This laboratory, where Bogolyubov worked for a long time, has traditionally been the home of the prominent Russian schools in quantum field theory, theoretical nuclear physics, statistical physics, and nonlinear mechanics. Bogolyubov was the director of the Joint Institute for Nuclear Research from 1966 to 1988.

=== Post-war work in Ukraine ===
In the post-war years, Bogolyubov worked as the dean of the Faculty of Mechanics and Mathematics at Kiev University and headed the Department of Probability Theory at the Institute of Mathematics of the Academy of Sciences of the Ukrainian SSR. His first students in nonlinear mechanics were Yurii Mitropolskyi and Yu. V. Blagoveshchensky, and in probability theory and mathematical statistics, I. I. Gikhman.

In the first half of the 1960s, Bogolyubov worked on organizing the Institute for Theoretical Physics of the Academy of Sciences of the Ukrainian SSR, and from 1966 to 1973, he served as its director. When the institute was established in 1966, it consisted of three departments: the Mathematical Methods in Theoretical Physics (head: Academician Ostap Parasyuk), the Theory of the Nucleus (head: Alexander Davydov), and the Theory of Elementary Particles (Albert Tavkhelidze). In 1968, the institute organized the Department of Nuclear Reaction Theory (head: Oleksiy Sytenko).

=== Family ===
Bogolyubov was married (since 1937) to Evgenia Pirashkova. They had two sons: Pavel and Nikolay Jr. The latter is a theoretical physicist working in the fields of mathematical physics and statistical mechanics. Pavel was a theoretical physicist, Doctor of Physical and Mathematical Sciences, senior researcher, and head of the sector at the Laboratory of Theoretical Physics of the Joint Institute for Nuclear Research.

=== Students ===
Bogolyubov was a scientific supervisor of the following: Yurii Mitropolskiy, Dmitry Shirkov, Selim Krein, Iosif Gihman, Tofik Mamedov, Kirill Gurov, Mikhail Polivanov, Naftul Polsky, Galina Biryuk, Sergei Tyablikov, Dmitry Zubarev, Vladimir Kadyshevsky, Yuri Klimontovich, and many other students. His method of teaching, based on creation of a warm atmosphere, politeness and kindness, is famous in Russia and is known as the "Bogolyubov approach".

=== Awards ===
Bogolyubov received various Soviet honors and international awards. He was also nominated 52 times for the Nobel Prize, though he never won one.

Soviet

- Two Stalin Prizes (1947, 1953)
- USSR State Prize (1984)
- Lenin Prize (1958)
- Hero of Socialist Labour, twice (1969, 1979)
- Six Orders of Lenin (1953, 1959, 1967, 1969, 1975, 1979)
- Order of the October Revolution (1984)
- Order of the Red Banner of Labour, twice (1948, 1954)
- Order of the Badge of Honour, twice (1944, 1944)

Foreign awards

- Order of Cyril and Methodius, 1st class (Bulgaria, 1969)
- Order "For merits", 2nd class (Poland, 1977)

Academic awards

- Award of the Bologna Academy of Sciences (1930)
- Heineman Prize for Mathematical Physics (American Physical Society, 1966)
- Gold Medal Helmholtz (Academy of Sciences of the German Democratic Republic, 1969)
- Max Planck Medal (1973)
- Franklin Medal (1974)
- Gold Medal "For service to science and humanity" (Slovak Academy of Sciences, 1975)
- Karpinski Prize (Germany, 1981)
- Gold Medal Lavrent'ev (1983) – for his work "On stochastic processes in dynamical systems"
- Lomonosov Gold Medal (1985) – for outstanding achievement in mathematics and theoretical physics
- Gold Medal of Lyapunov (1989) – for his work on sustainability, critical phenomena and phase transitions in the theory of many interacting particles
- Dirac Medal (1992, posthumously)

Academic recognition

- Foreign Honorary Member of the National Academy of Sciences (United States, 1959), American Academy of Arts and Sciences (1960), Bulgarian Academy of Sciences (1961); a foreign member of the Polish Academy of Sciences (1962), GDR Academy of Sciences (1966), Hungarian Academy of Sciences (1970), Academy of Sciences in Heidelberg (1968), Czechoslovak Academy of Sciences (1980), Indian Academy of Sciences (1983), Mongolian Academy of Sciences (1983)
- Honorary Doctor of the University of Allahabad, India (1958), Berlin (East Germany, 1960), Chicago (USA, 1967), Turin (Italy, 1969), Wroclaw (Poland, 1970), Bucharest (Romania, 1971), Helsinki (Finland, 1973), Ulan Bator (Mongolia, 1977), Warsaw (Poland, 1977)

Memory

Institutions, awards and locations have been named in Bogolyubov's memory:

- N.N. Bogolyubov Institute for Theoretical Problems of Microphysics (Moscow State University)
- Bogoliubov Institute of Theoretical Physics National Academy of Sciences of Ukraine (Kyiv, Ukraine)
- Bogoliubov Laboratory of Theoretical Physics (Joint Institute for Nuclear Research, Dubna)
- Bogolyubov Prize (Joint Institute for Nuclear Research) for scientists with outstanding contribution to theoretical physics and applied mathematics
- Bogolyubov Prize for young scientists (Joint Institute for Nuclear Research)
- Bogolyubov Prize (National Academy of Sciences of Ukraine) for scientists with outstanding contribution to theoretical physics and applied mathematics
- Bogolyubov Gold Medal (Russian Academy of Sciences)
- Bust of Academician NN Bogolyubov (Nizhny Novgorod)
- Bust of Academician NN Bogolyubov (Dubna)
- Bogolyubov prospect (Russian: проспект Боголюбова) (Dubna's central street)
- Commemorative plaque at the entrance of the Physics Department of Moscow State University

In 2009, the centenary of Bogolyubov's birth was celebrated with two conferences in Russia and Ukraine:

- International Bogolyubov Conference: Problems of Theoretical and Mathematical Physics 21–27 August, Moscow-Dubna, Russia.
- Bogolyubov Kyiv Conference: Modern Problems of Theoretical and Mathematical Physics 15–18 September, Kyiv, Ukraine.

== Research ==
Fundamental works of Bogolyubov were devoted to asymptotic methods of nonlinear mechanics, quantum field theory, statistical field theory, variational calculus, approximation methods in mathematical analysis, equations of mathematical physics, theory of stability, theory of dynamical systems, and to many other areas.

He built a new theory of scattering matrices, formulated the concept of microscopical causality, obtained important results in quantum electrodynamics, and investigated on the basis of the edge-of-the-wedge theorem the dispersion relations in elementary particle physics. He suggested a new synthesis of the Bohr theory of quasiperiodic functions and developed methods for asymptotic integration of nonlinear differential equations which describe oscillating processes.

=== Mathematics and non-linear mechanics ===
- In 1932–1943, in the early stage of his career, he worked in collaboration with Nikolay Krylov on mathematical problems of nonlinear mechanics and developed mathematical methods for asymptotic integration of non-linear differential equations. He also applied these methods to problems of statistical mechanics.
- In 1937, jointly with Nikolay Krylov he proved the Krylov–Bogolyubov theorems.
- In 1956, at the International Conference on Theoretical Physics in Seattle, USA (September, 1956), he presented the formulation and the first proof of the edge-of-the-wedge theorem. This theorem in the theory of functions of several complex variables has important implications to the dispersion relations in elementary particle physics.

=== Statistical mechanics ===
- 1939 Jointly with Nikolay Krylov gave the first consistent microscopic derivation of the Fokker–Planck equation in the single scheme of classical and quantum mechanics.
- 1945 Suggested the idea of hierarchy of relaxation times, which is significant for statistical theory of irreversible processes.
- 1946 Developed a general method for a microscopic derivation of kinetic equations for classical systems. The method was based on the hierarchy of equations for multi-particle distribution functions known now as Bogoliubov–Born–Green–Kirkwood–Yvon hierarchy.
- 1947 Jointly with K. P. Gurov extended this method to the derivation of kinetic equations for quantum systems on the basis of the quantum BBGKY hierarchy.
- 1947—1948 Introduced kinetic equations in the theory of superfluidity, computed the excitation spectrum for a weakly interacting Bose gas, showed that this spectrum has the same properties as spectrum of helium II, and used this analogy for a theoretical description of superfluidity of helium II.
- 1958 Formulated a microscopic theory of superconductivity and established an analogy between superconductivity and superfluidity phenomena; this contribution was discussed in details in the book A New Method in the Theory of Superconductivity (co-authors V. V. Tolmachev and D. V. Shirkov, Moscow, Academy of Sciences Press, 1958).

=== Quantum theory ===
- 1955 Developed an axiomatic theory for the scattering matrix (S-matrix) in quantum field theory and introduced the causality condition for S-matrix in terms of variational derivatives.
- 1955 Jointly with Dmitry Shirkov developed the renormalization group method.
- 1955 Jointly with Ostap Parasyuk proved the theorem on the finiteness and uniqueness (for renormalizable theories) of the scattering matrix in any order of perturbation theory (Bogoliubov–Parasyuk theorem) and developed a procedure (R-operation) for a practical subtraction of singularities in quantum field theory.
- 1965 Jointly with Boris Struminsky and Albert Tavkhelidze and independently of Moo-Young Han, Yoichiro Nambu and Oscar W. Greenberg suggested a triplet quark model and introduced a new quantum degree of freedom (later called as color charge) for quarks.
- Suggested a first proof of dispersion relations in quantum field theory.

== Publications ==
=== Books ===
Mathematics and Non-linear Mechanics:

1. N. M. Krylov and N. N. Bogoliubov (1934): On various formal expansions of non-linear mechanics. Kyiv, Izdat. Zagal'noukr. Akad. Nauk. (in Ukrainian)
2. N. M. Krylov and N. N. Bogoliubov (1947): Introduction to Nonlinear Mechanics. Princeton, Princeton University Press.
3. N. N. Bogoliubov, Y. A. Mitropolsky (1961): Asymptotic Methods in the Theory of Non-Linear Oscillations. New York, Gordon and Breach.

Statistical Mechanics:

1. N. N. Bogoliubov (1945): On Some Statistical Methods in Mathematical Physics. Kyiv (in Russian).
2. N. N. Bogoliubov, V. V. Tolmachev, D. V. Shirkov (1959): A New Method in the Theory of Superconductivity. New York, Consultants Bureau.
3. N. N. Bogoliubov (1960): Problems of Dynamic Theory in Statistical Physics. Oak Ridge, Tenn., Technical Information Service.
4. N. N. Bogoliubov (1967–1970): Lectures on Quantum Statistics. Problems of Statistical Mechanics of Quantum Systems. New York, Gordon and Breach.
5. N. N. Bogolubov and N. N. Bogolubov, Jnr. (1992): Introduction to Quantum Statistical Mechanics. Gordon and Breach. ISBN 2-88124-879-9.

Quantum Field Theory:

1. N. N. Bogoliubov, B. V. Medvedev, M. K. Polivanov (1958): Problems in the Theory of Dispersion Relations. Institute for Advanced Study, Princeton.
2. N. N. Bogoliubov, D. V. Shirkov (1959): The Theory of Quantized Fields. New York, Interscience. The first text-book on the renormalization group theory.
3. N. N. Bogoliubov, A. A. Logunov and I. T. Todorov (1975): Introduction to Axiomatic Quantum Field Theory. Reading, Mass.: W. A. Benjamin, Advanced Book Program. ISBN 978-0-8053-0982-9. ISBN 0-8053-0982-9.
4. N. N. Bogoliubov, D. V. Shirkov (1980): Introduction to the Theory of Quantized Field. John Wiley & Sons Inc; 3rd edition. ISBN 0-471-04223-4. ISBN 978-0-471-04223-5.
5. N. N. Bogoliubov, D. V. Shirkov (1982): Quantum Fields. Benjamin-Cummings Pub. Co., ISBN 0-8053-0983-7.
6. N. N. Bogoliubov, A. A. Logunov, A. I. Oksak, I. T. Todorov (1990): General Principles of Quantum Field Theory. Dordrecht [Holland]; Boston, Kluwer Academic Publishers. ISBN 0-7923-0540-X. ISBN 978-0-7923-0540-8.

Selected works

1. N. N. Bogoliubov, Selected Works. Part I. Dynamical Theory. Gordon and Breach, New York, 1990. ISBN 2-88124-752-0, ISBN 978-2-88124-752-1.
2. N. N. Bogoliubov, Selected Works. Part II. Quantum and Classical Statistical Mechanics. Gordon and Breach, New York, 1991. ISBN 2-88124-768-7.
3. N. N. Bogoliubov, Selected Works. Part III. Nonlinear Mechanics and Pure Mathematics. Gordon and Breach, Amsterdam, 1995. ISBN 2-88124-918-3.
4. N. N. Bogoliubov, Selected Works. Part IV. Quantum Field Theory. Gordon and Breach, Amsterdam, 1995. ISBN 2-88124-926-4, ISBN 978-2-88124-926-6.

=== Selected papers ===
- Bogoliubov, N. N. (1948). "Equations of Hydrodynamics in Statistical Mechanics" (in Ukrainian)". Sbornik Trudov Instituta Matematiki AN USSR. 10: 41–59.
- "On Question about Superfluidity Condition in the Nuclear Matter Theory" (in Russian), Doklady Akademii Nauk USSR, 119, 52, 1958.
- "On One Variational Principle in Many Body Problem" (in Russian), Doklady Akademii Nauk USSR, 119, N2, 244, 1959.
- "On Compensation Principle in the Method of Self conformed Field" (in Russian), Uspekhi Fizicheskhih Nauk, 67, N4, 549, 1959.
- "The Quasi-averages in Problems of Statistical Mechanics" (in Russian), Preprint D-781, JINR, Dubna, 1961.
- "On the Hydrodynamics of a Superfluiding" (in Russian), Preprint P-1395, JINR, Dubna, 1963.

== See also ==
- Bogoliubov approximation
- Bogolyubov-Born-Green-Kirkwood-Yvon hierarchy
- Bogoliubov causality condition
- Bogolyubov's edge-of-the-wedge theorem
- Bogolyubov inequality
- Bogoliubov inner product
- Bogolyubov's lemma
- Bogoliubov–Parasyuk theorem
- Bogoliubov quasiparticle
- Bogoliubov transformation
- Describing function method
- Goldstone boson
- Krylov-Bogoliubov averaging method
- Krylov-Bogolyubov theorem
- Landau pole
- Peierls–Bogoliubov inequality
- Quantum triviality
