= Kirill Gurov =

Soviet physicist

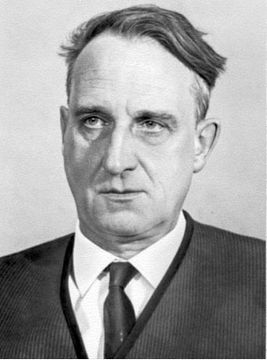
- Born: 6 March 1918; Moscow, Russia, USSR
- Died: 29 September 1994 (aged 76)
- Education: Moscow State University (1941)
- Known for: significant contribution to kinetic theory
- Scientific career
- Fields: theoretical physics, kinetic theory
- Workplaces: Moscow State University; A. A. Baikov Institute of Metallurgy and Material Science (IMMS)
- Doctoral advisor: Nikolay Bogolyubov

Kirill Gurov (6 March 1918 – 29 September 1994) was a Soviet Russian theoretical physicist working in the field of physical kinetics.

Gurov was born in Moscow, Russia, in the family of a military officer. In 1936, he was accepted without examinations to the Faculty of Physics and Mathematics in Moscow State University (MSU) and graduated from MSU in 1941, earning a Diploma with Honour.

In 1944, he started to work in MSU as a PhD student, under the supervision of Nikolay Bogolyubov, on problems of kinetic theory of quantum systems. From 1954, and for the rest of his life, Kirill Gurov worked at the A. A. Baikov Institute of Metallurgy and Material Science (IMMS).

== Research ==
Kirill Gurov and Nikolay Bogolyubov obtained kinetic equations for quantum systems by developing the method of quantum BBGKY hierarchy.

At the IMMS, Kirill Gurov worked on analysis of the diffusion processes and the corresponding phase transitions in alloys. Since the middle of the 1970s, he worked on developing materials for space projects, participated in the Apollo-Soyuz Test Project, and studied the effects of zero gravity on material properties.

== Books ==
- Gurov K. P. (1966). Foundations of the Kinetic Theory. Method of N. N. Bogolyubov (in Russian). Moscow: Nauka.
