= Lee–Huang–Yang correction =

Correction for Bose–Einstein condensates

In condensed matter physics, the Lee–Huang–Yang (LHY) correction is a modification to the mathematical treatment of Bose–Einstein condensate (BEC) systems that manifests as a relative repulsive effect. BEC systems are usually best described by mean-field interactions. But in cases where these interactions cancel out, the systems' behavior is described by the quantum fluctuations of next order term, described by the Lee–Huang–Yang (LHY) correction to the ground state energy. In this regime, it has recently been found that the system can take on fluidic properties.

The theory was first enunciated by T. D. Lee, Kerson Huang, and C. N. Yang in a 1957 paper.
