= Roton =

Collective excitation in superfluid helium-4 (a quasiparticle)

Roton dispersion relation, showing the quasiparticle energy E(p) as a function of momentum p. A quasiparticle with momentum generated in the local energy minimum is called a roton.

In theoretical physics, a roton is an elementary excitation, or quasiparticle, seen in superfluid helium-4 and Bose–Einstein condensates with long-range dipolar interactions or spin-orbit coupling. The dispersion relation of elementary excitations in this superfluid shows a linear increase from the origin, but exhibits first a maximum and then a minimum in energy as the momentum increases. Excitations with momenta in the linear region are called phonons; those with momenta close to the minimum are called rotons. Excitations with momenta near the maximum are called maxons.

The term "roton-like" is also used for the predicted eigenmodes in 3D metamaterials using beyond-nearest-neighbor coupling. A "roton-like" dispersion relation was demonstrated under ambient conditions for both acoustic pressure waves in a channel-based metamaterial at audible frequencies and transverse elastic waves in a microscale metamaterial at ultrasound frequencies.

== Models ==
Originally, the roton spectrum was phenomenologically introduced by Lev Landau in 1947. Currently there exist helium-4 based models which try to explain the roton spectrum with varying degrees of success and fundamentality.

The requirement for any model of this kind is that it must explain not only the shape of the spectrum itself but also other related observables, such as the speed of sound and structure factor of superfluid helium-4. Microwave and Bragg spectroscopy has been conducted on helium to study the roton spectrum.

== Bose–Einstein condensation ==
Bose–Einstein condensation of rotons has been also proposed and studied. In Bose-Einstein condensates, of magnetic atoms rotons are expected to occur caused by the magnetic dipole-dipole interactions. Rotons were first detected experimentally in 2018 with a Bose-Einstein condensate of Erbium atoms.

Under specific conditions the roton minimum gives rise to a crystal solid-like structure called the supersolid, detected experimentally in 2019.

== See also ==
- Superfluid
- Macroscopic quantum phenomena
- Bose–Einstein condensate
- Weakly interacting Bose gas
