= Krylov–Bogolyubov theorem =

One of two theorems in dynamical systems

In mathematics, the Krylov–Bogolyubov theorem (also known as the existence of invariant measures theorem) may refer to either of the two related fundamental theorems within the theory of dynamical systems. The theorems guarantee the existence of invariant measures for certain "nice" maps defined on "nice" spaces and were named after Russian-Ukrainian mathematicians and theoretical physicists Nikolay Krylov and Nikolay Bogolyubov who proved the theorems.

== Formulation of the theorems ==
=== Invariant measures for a single map ===
Theorem (Krylov–Bogolyubov). Let X be a compact, metrizable topological space and F : X → X a continuous map. Then F admits an invariant Borel probability measure.

That is, if Borel(X) denotes the Borel σ-algebra generated by the collection T of open subsets of X, then there exists a probability measure μ : Borel(X) → [0, 1] such that for any subset A ∈ Borel(X),

$$\mu \left( F^{-1} (A) \right) = \mu (A).$$

In terms of the push forward, this states that

$$F_{*} (\mu) = \mu.$$

=== Invariant measures for a Markov process ===
Let X be a Polish space and let $P_t, t\ge 0,$ be the transition probabilities for a time-homogeneous Markov semigroup on X, i.e.

$$\Pr [ X_{t} \in A | X_{0} = x ] = P_{t} (x, A).$$

Theorem (Krylov–Bogolyubov). If there exists a point $x\in X$ for which the family of probability measures { P_{t}(x, ·) | t > 0 } is uniformly tight and the semigroup (P_{t}) satisfies the Feller property, then there exists at least one invariant measure for (P_{t}), i.e. a probability measure μ on X such that

$$(P_{t})_{\ast} (\mu) = \mu \mbox{ for all } t > 0.$$

== See also ==
- For the 1st theorem: Ya. G. Sinai (Ed.) (1997): Dynamical Systems II. Ergodic Theory with Applications to Dynamical Systems and Statistical Mechanics. Berlin, New York: Springer-Verlag. ISBN 3-540-17001-4. (Section 1).
- For the 2nd theorem: G. Da Prato and J. Zabczyk (1996): Ergodicity for Infinite Dimensional Systems. Cambridge Univ. Press. ISBN 0-521-57900-7. (Section 3).
