= Fermi contact interaction =

Magnetic interaction between an electron and a nucleus

The Fermi contact interaction is the magnetic interaction between an electron and an atomic nucleus. Its major manifestation is in electron paramagnetic resonance and nuclear magnetic resonance spectroscopies, where it is responsible for the appearance of isotropic hyperfine coupling.

This requires that the electron occupies an s-orbital. The interaction is described with the parameter A, which takes the units megahertz. The magnitude of A is given by this relationships

$$A = -\frac{8}{3} \pi \left \langle \boldsymbol{\mu}_n \cdot \boldsymbol{\mu}_e \right \rangle |\Psi (0)|^2\qquad \mbox{(cgs)}$$

and

$$A = -\frac{2}{3} \mu_0 \left \langle \boldsymbol{\mu}_n \cdot \boldsymbol{\mu}_e \right \rangle |\Psi(0)|^2, \qquad \mbox{(SI)}$$

where A is the energy of the interaction, μ_{n} is the nuclear magnetic moment, μ_{e} is the electron magnetic dipole moment, Ψ(0) is the value of the electron wavefunction at the nucleus, and $\left\langle \cdots \right\rangle$ denotes the quantum mechanical spin coupling.

It has been pointed out that it is an ill-defined problem because the standard formulation assumes that the nucleus has a magnetic dipolar moment, which is not always the case.

Simplified view of the Fermi contact interaction in the terms of nuclear (green arrow) and electron spins (blue arrow). 1: in H_{2}, ^{1}H spin polarizes electron spin antiparallel. This in turn polarizes the other electron of the σ-bond antiparallel as demanded by Pauli's exclusion principle. Electron polarizes the other ^{1}H. ^{1}H nuclei are antiparallel and ^{1}J_{HH} has a positive value. 2: ^{1}H nuclei are parallel. This form is unstable (has higher energy E) than the form 1. 3: vicinal ^{1}H J-coupling via ^{12}C or ^{13}C nuclei. Same as before, but electron spins on p-orbitals are parallel due to Hund's 1. rule. ^{1}H nuclei are antiparallel and ^{3}J_{HH} has a positive value.

== Use in magnetic resonance spectroscopy ==
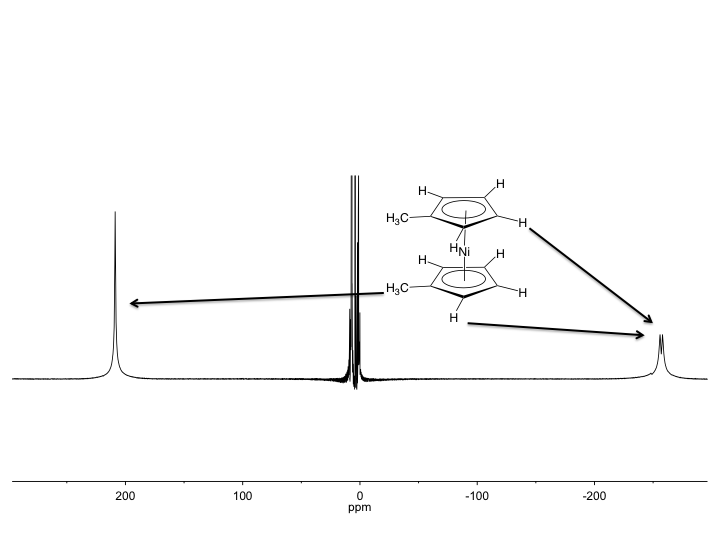
^{1}H NMR spectrum of 1,1'-dimethylnickelocene, illustrating the dramatic chemical shifts observed in some paramagnetic compounds. The sharp signals near 0 ppm are from solvent.

Roughly, the magnitude of A indicates the extent to which the unpaired spin resides on the nucleus. Thus, knowledge of the A values allows one to map the singly occupied molecular orbital.

== History ==
The interaction was first derived by Enrico Fermi in 1930. A classical derivation of this term is contained in "Classical Electrodynamics" by J. D. Jackson. In short, the classical energy may be written in terms of the energy of one magnetic dipole moment in the magnetic field B(r) of another dipole. This field acquires a simple expression when the distance r between the two dipoles goes to zero, since

$$\int_{S(r)} \mathbf{B}(\mathbf{r}) \, d^3\mathbf{r} = -\frac 2 3  \mu_0 \boldsymbol{\mu}.$$
