= Joint Institute for Nuclear Research =

Physics research institute in Russia

Joint Institute for Nuclear Research (JINR) Объединённый институт ядерных исследований, ОИЯИ

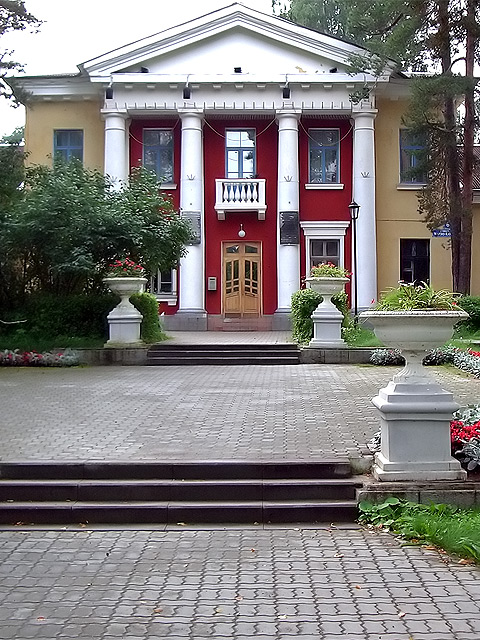
- Formation: March 26, 1956; 70 years ago
- Headquarters: Dubna, Russia
- Coordinates: 56°44′47″N 37°11′22″E
- Members: 13 countries: Armenia; Azerbaijan; Belarus; Cuba; Egypt; Georgia; Kazakhstan; Moldova; Mongolia; Russia; Slovakia; Uzbekistan; Vietnam; Associate members: Germany; Hungary; Italy; Serbia; South Africa
- Official languages: English and Russian
- Director General: Grigory Trubnikov
- Website: www.jinr.ru

The Joint Institute for Nuclear Research (JINR, Russian: Объединённый институт ядерных исследований, ОИЯИ), in Dubna, Moscow Oblast (110 km north of Moscow), Russia, is an international research center for nuclear sciences, with 5,500 staff members including 1,200 researchers holding over 1,000 PhDs from eighteen countries. Most scientists are scientists of the Russian Federation.

The institute has seven laboratories, each with its own specialisation: theoretical physics, high energy physics (particle physics), heavy ion physics, condensed matter physics, nuclear reactions, neutron physics, and information technology. The institute has a division to study radiation and radiobiological research and other ad hoc experimental physics experiments.

Principal research instruments include a nuclotron superconductive particle accelerator (particle energy: 7 GeV), three isochronous cyclotrons (120, 145, 650 MeV), a phasitron (680 MeV) and a synchrophasotron (4 GeV). The site has a neutron fast-pulse reactor (1,500MW pulse) with nineteen associated instruments receiving neutron beams.

== Founding ==
The Joint Institute for Nuclear Research was established on the basis of an agreement signed on 26 March 1956, in Moscow by representatives of the governments of the eleven founding countries, with a view to combining their scientific and material potential. The USSR contributed 50 percent, the People's Republic of China 20 percent. In February 1957, the JINR was registered by the United Nations. The institute is located in Dubna, 120 km north of Moscow.

At the time of the creation of JINR, the Institute of Nuclear Problems (INP) of the Academy of Sciences of the USSR already existed at the site of the future Dubna since the late 1940s, and it launched a program of fundamental and applied research at the synchrocyclotron. The Electrophysics Laboratory of the Academy of Sciences of the USSR (EFLAN) was established, and under the guidance of Academician Vladimir Veksler, work began to create a new accelerator – a proton synchrophasotron – with a record energy of 10 GeV at that time.

By the mid-1950s, there was a worldwide consensus that nuclear science should be accessible and that only broad cooperation could ensure the progressive development of this research, as well as the peaceful use of atomic energy. Thus, in 1954, near Geneva, CERN (European Organization for Nuclear Research) was established. At about the same time, the countries that belonged to the socialist community decided to establish a Joint Institute for Nuclear Research on the basis of the INP and EFLAN.

The first director of the United Institute was Professor D. I. Blokhintsev, who just completed the creation of Obninsk Nuclear Power Plant the world's first nuclear power plant in Obninsk. The first vice-directors of JINR were professors Marian Danysz (Poland) and V. Votruba (Czechoslovakia).

The history of the formation of the JINR is associated with the names of prominent scientists and Professors. The following list provides some of the names of prominent scientists.

- Nikolay Bogolyubov
- Lajos Jánossy
- Leopold Infeld
- Igor Kurchatov
- Heinz Pose
- Heinz Barwich
- Karl Lanius
- Igor Tamm
- Aleksandr Topchiev
- Alexander Baldin
- Wang Ganchang
- Zhou Guangzhao
- Vladimir Veksler
- Nikolay Govorun
- Venedikt Dzhelepov
- Jaroslav Kožešník
- Kroó Norbert
- Moisey Markov
- Șerban Țițeica
- Georgi Nadjakov
- Nguyễn Văn Hiệu
- Le Van Thiem
- Yuri Oganessian
- Lénárd Pál
- Bruno Pontecorvo
- Boris Arbuzov
- Aureliu Emil Săndulescu
- Albert Tavkhelidze
- Georgy Flyorov
- Ilya Frank
- Andrzej Hrynkiewicz
- F. Shapiro
- Dmitry Shirkov
- E. Yanik (Polish: Jerzy Janik)

== Cooperation ==
The JINR cooperates with many organizations. One of the main organizations with which JINR cooperates is UNESCO. Its collaboration with JINR started in 1997 in order to develop basic sciences and try to achieve sustainable development. Joint activities include training programmes and grant mechanisms for researchers in the basic science. This international scientific cooperation and knowledge sharing in key scientific fields is one of the main 2030 UNESCO goals, the achievement of Sustainable Development.

The United Nations General Assembly and UNESCO General Conference named 2019 as The International Year of the Periodic Table of Chemical Elements (IYPTE 2019). This reinforced the cooperation between these two organizations. JINR was one of the observers of European Organization for Nuclear Research (CERN) from 2014 till 25 March 2022.

As of 1 January 2023, 13 JINR state members are active and three suspended:

- Azerbaijan
- Armenia
- Belarus
- Bulgaria (suspended)
- Democratic People's Republic of Korea (suspended)
- Vietnam
- Georgia
- Kazakhstan
- Cuba
- Republic of Moldova
- Mongolia
- Russia
- Romania
- Slovakia (suspended)
- Uzbekistan
- Egypt

Associate members are:

- Germany
- Hungary
- Italy
- South Africa
- Serbia

Scientific collaboration with organizations including:

- CERN – since 2014, subject to restrictions detailed in the CERN Council resolutions 3671 and 3638 following the invasion of Ukraine by the Russian Federation. Collaboration to be reviewed well in advance of January 2025, the expiration date of the International Cooperation Agreement.
- UNESCO – since 1997
- BMBF, since 1991.
- INFN, since 1996.
- University of Turin, since 1999.
- EPS, since 1990.

Former members: In December 2022 the Czech Republic, Poland and Ukraine terminated their membership and Bulgaria and Slovakia suspended their participation in JINR. The Democratic People's Republic of Korea was one of the founding states in 1956. It has been suspended from participating in JINR since 2015.

== Structure of research ==
The main fields of the institute's research are:

- Theoretical physics
- Elementary particle physics
- Relativistic nuclear physics
- Heavy ion physics
- Low and intermediate energy physics
- Nuclear physics with neutrons
- Condensed matter physics
- Radiobiology
- Computer networking, computing and computational physics
- Educational programme

The JINR possess eight laboratories and University Centre.

JINR laboratories
Name	Realm of Physics	Facilities	Notes
University Centre (UC)	Academic Environment		
Bogoliubov Laboratory of Theoretical Physics (BLTP)	Theoretical physics		
Veksler and Baldin Laboratory of High Energy Physics (VBLHE)	High Energy Physics	Nuclotron, Synchrophasotron, NICA	Nuclotron is the first superconductive synchrotron in World with particle energy up to 7 GeV. Synchrophasotron has particle energy of 4 GeV. NICA is associated with Nuclotron experiment
Laboratory of Particle Physics (LPP)	Particle Physics		
Dzhelepov Laboratory of Nuclear Problems (DLNP)	Nuclear physics	Synchrocyclotron	Synchrocyclotron with the energy 680 MeV and with the intensity of extracted beam 2.5mkA. In addition it is used for Radiation therapy
Flerov Laboratory of Nuclear Reactions (FLNR)	Nuclear physics	U400, U400M, IC100 Cyclotron and MT-25 microtron	The laboratory producing new elements
Frank Laboratory of Neutron Physics (FLNP)	Nuclear physics	IBR-2, IREN	IBR-2 high-flux pulsed Fast-neutron reactor and together with IREN Facility are main Neutron source
Laboratory of Information Technologies (LIT)	Theoretical physics	HybriLIT	Provision with the network, computing and information resources as well as mathematical support of experimental and theoretical studies
Laboratory of Radiation Biology (LRB)	Radiation therapy, Radiobiology		

== Superheavy Element Factory ==
The Superheavy Element Factory (SHE factory) at the JINR, opened in 2019, is a new experimental complex dedicated to superheavy element research. Its facilities enable a tenfold increase in beam intensity; such an increase in sensitivity enables the study of reactions with lower cross sections that would otherwise be inaccessible. Sergey Dmitriev, director of the Flerov Laboratory of Nuclear Reactions, believes that the SHE factory will enable closer examination of nuclei near the limits of stability, as well as experiments aimed at the synthesis of elements 119 and 120.

== Scientific achievements ==
More than 40 major achievements in particle physics have been made through experiments at JINR, including:

- 1957 – prediction of neutrino oscillation, published in JETP by Bruno Pontecorvo
- 1976 – element 107 (bohrium)
- 1999 – element 114 (flerovium)
- 2000 – element 116 (livermorium)
- 2002 – element 118 (oganesson)
- 2003 – element 115 (moscovium) and element 113 (nihonium)
- 2010 – synthesis of element 117 (tennessine)

== Prizes and awards ==
JINR has instituted awards to honour and encourage high-level research in the fields of physics and mathematics since 1961.

- The Bogolyubov Prize for young scientists – an award for young researchers in theoretical physics.
- The Bogolyubov Prize – an international award to scientists with outstanding contribution to theoretical physics and applied mathematics.
- The Bruno Pontecorvo Prize – is an award to scientists with contribution to elementary particle physics.

The first award was dedicated to Wang Ganchang, deputy director from 1958 to 1960 and the Soviet Professor Vladimir Veksler for the discovery of antisigma-minus hyperon.

== Directors ==
- Dmitry Blokhintsev (1956–1965)
- Nikolay Bogolyubov (1966–1988)
- Dezső Kiss (1989–1991)
- Vladimir Kadyshevsky (1992–2005)
- Alexei Sisakian (2005–2010)
- Mikhail G. Itkis (May 2010–September 2011) ad interim
- Victor A. Matveev (2012–2020)
- Grigory V. Trubnikov (since 2021)

== Gallery ==
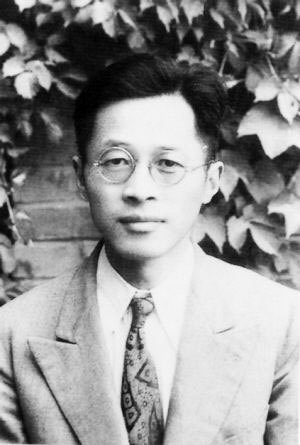
Wang Ganchang

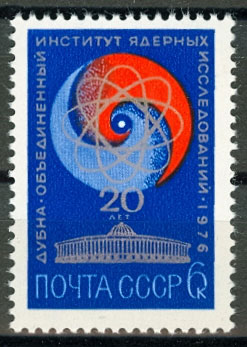
Postage stamp of the USSR, 1976

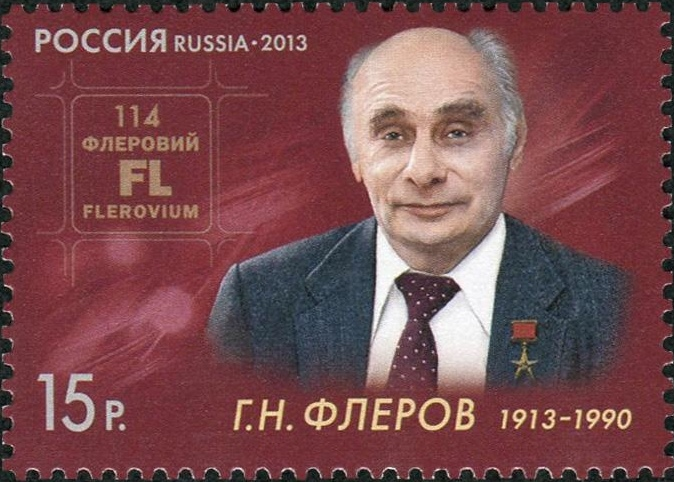
Georgy Flyorov, founder of JINR

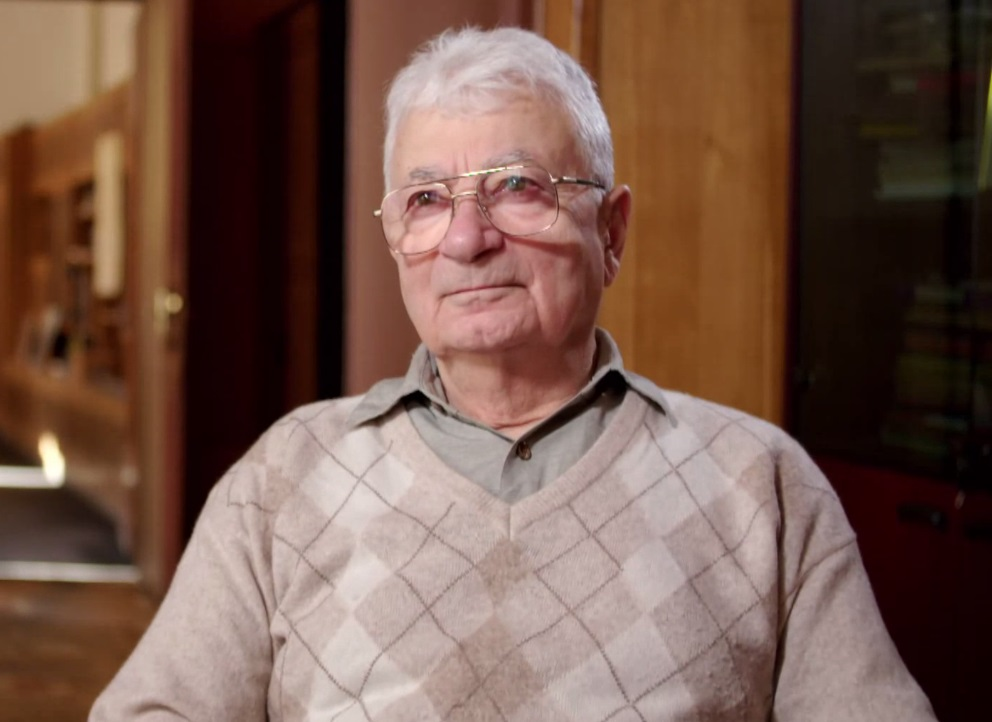
Yuri Oganessian

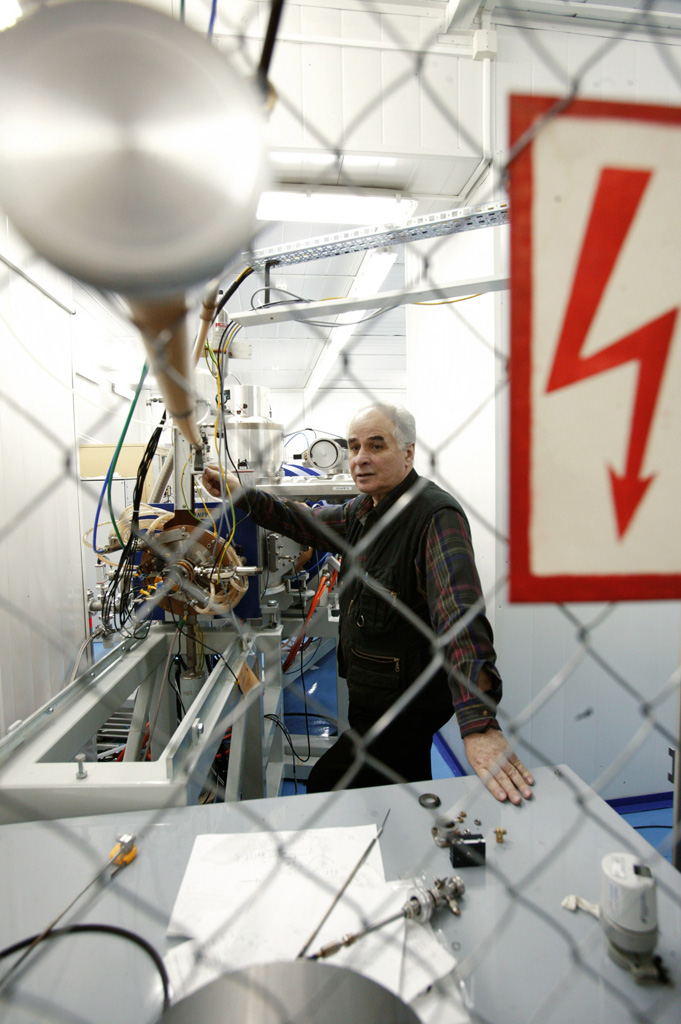
Eduard Kozulin, head of group at the Laboratory of Nuclear Reactions, checking the experiment readiness of the super sensitive analyzer of heavy atoms mass.

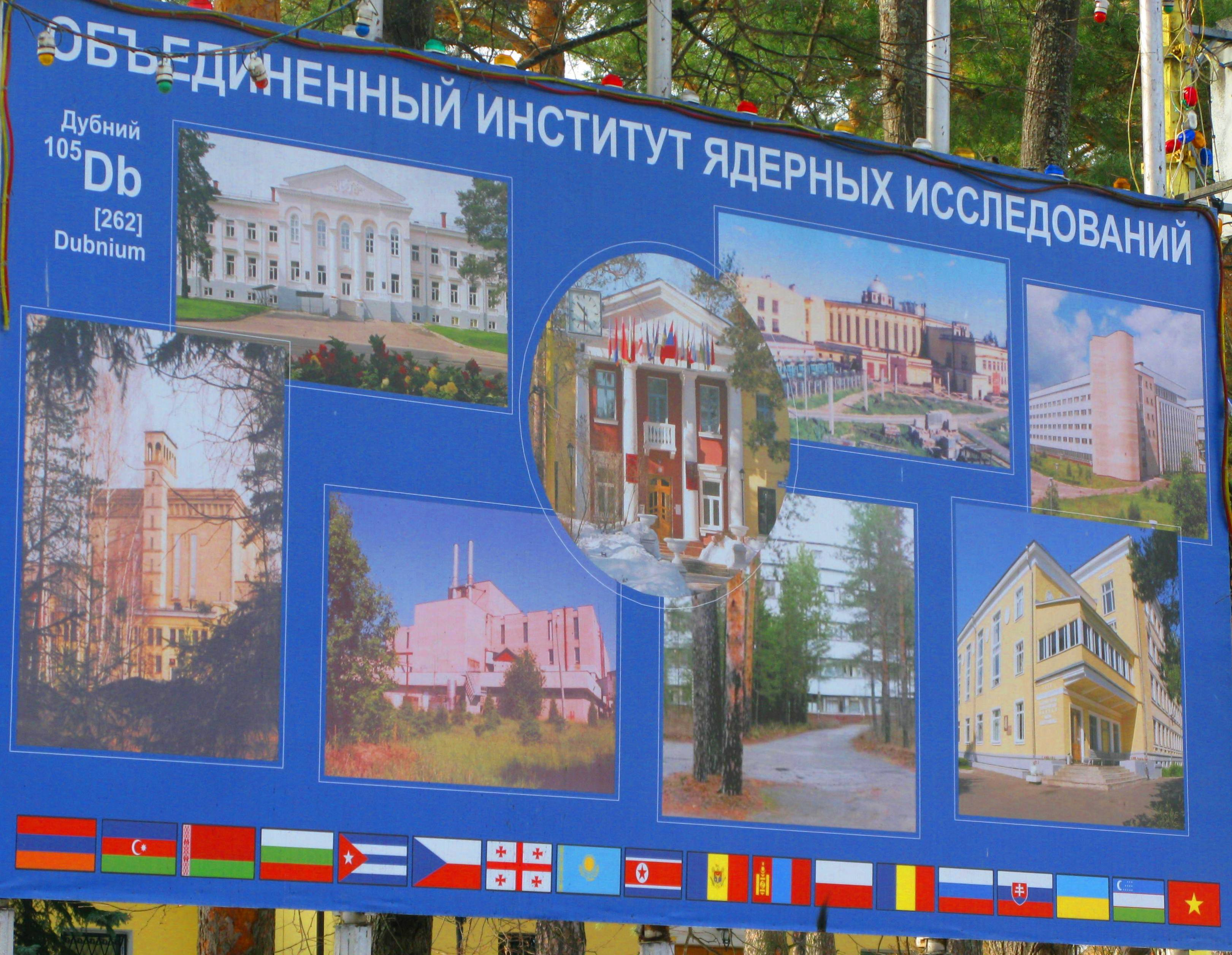
a picture of JINR members

== See also ==
- Nuclotron
- Institute for Nuclear Research
- Budker Institute of Nuclear Physics, Russian particle physics laboratory in Novosibirsk
- Institute for High Energy Physics, Russian particle physics laboratory in the vicinity of Moscow; located south of Moscow
- Institute for Theoretical and Experimental Physics, Russian particle physics laboratory in the vicinity of Moscow; located in Moscow proper
- Bogolyubov Prize for young scientists, an award for young scientists provided by JINR
