= Bogoliubov Prize =

Bogoliubov Prize may refer to:

- Bogoliubov Prize for young scientists, an award offered by the Joint Institute for Nuclear Research for young researchers in theoretical physics.
- Bogoliubov Prize (NASU), an award offered by the National Academy of Sciences of Ukraine for scientists with outstanding contribution to theoretical physics and applied mathematics.
