= Nuclotron =

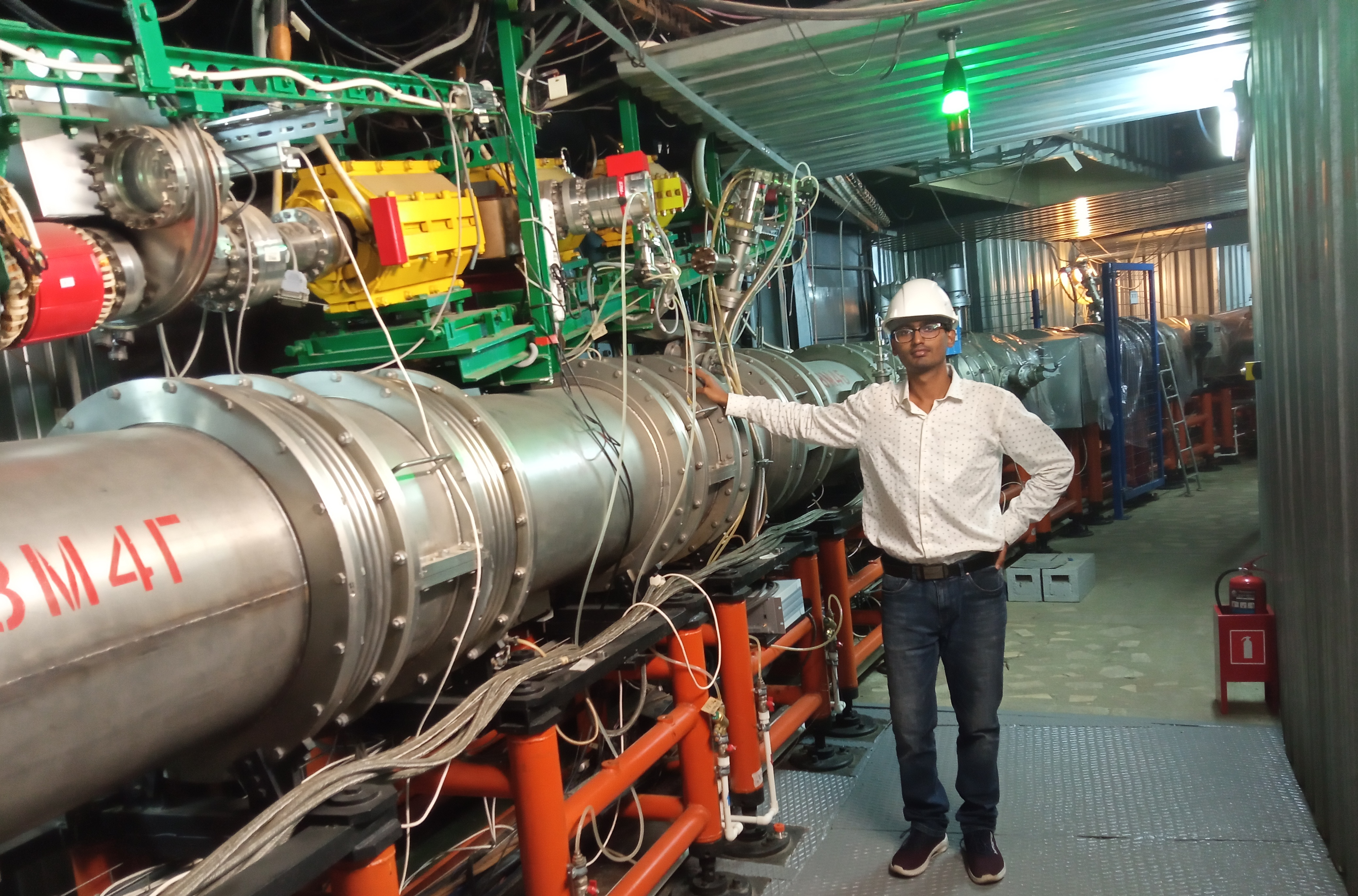
Superconductive heavy ion synchrotron-nuclotron present at Veksler and Baldin Laboratory of High Energy Physics in Joint Institute for Nuclear Research, Dubna

Nuclotron is a superconductive synchrotron, exploited by the Joint Institute for Nuclear Research in Dubna, Russia. This particle accelerator is based on a miniature iron-shaped field superconductive magnets, and has a particle energy up to 7 GeV. It was built in 1987–1992 as a part of Dubna synchrophasotron modernisation program (the Nuclotron ring follows the outer perimeter of the superconductive booster synchrotron ring). Five runs of about 1400 hours total duration have been provided by the present time. The most important experiments tested the cryomagnetic system of a novel type, and obtained data on nuclear collisions using internal target.

== See also ==
- Joint Institute for Nuclear Research
- Synchrophasotron
