= Nuclotron-based Ion Collider Facility =

Ion collider in Dubna, Russia

NICA (Nuclotron-based Ion Collider fAcility) is a particle collider complex being constructed by the Joint Institute for Nuclear Research in Dubna, Russia to perform experiments such as Nuclotron ion beams extracted to a fixed target and colliding beams of ions, ions-protons, polarized protons and deuterons. The projected maximum kinetic energy of the accelerated ions is 4.5 GeV per nucleon, and 12.6 GeV for protons.

== NICA setup ==
Main elements of the NICA complex are:

- Two-tier injection complex
- Booster
- Superconducting synchrotron Nuclotron
- Collider facility
- Multi-Purpose Detector (MPD)
- Spin Physics Detector (SPD)
- Beam transport channels.

LU-20 injection device produces ions of 5 MeV/n energy. It is succeeded by three-staged Light Ion Linac (LILAc) that is capable of light particles acceleration up 7 MeV/n energy, 13 MeV proton acceleration section and a 20 MeV superconducting HWR proton accelerating section.

Heavy-Ion Linac (HILAc), conceived in 2016 by the JNIR-Bevatech collaboration, accelerates heavy gold ions up to the energy of 3.2 MeV/n with beam intensity of 2 billion particles per pulse, and a repetition rate of 10 Hz. The gold ions are injected from a JNIR-made KRION superconducting electron-string heavy ion source.

The Booster, a superconducting synchrotron, accumulates, cools and further accelerates heavy ions to 600 MeV/n energy. The booster's circumference is 211 meters, its magnetic structure is mounted inside the yoke of the Nuclotron. The Booster is supposed to ensure ultrahigh vacuum of 10^{−11} Torr.

The Nuclotron to be used in NICA was constructed in 1987–1992. It is the world's first synchrotron based on fast cycling electromagnets of the 'window frame' type with superconducting coil.

The collider is made of two identical 503-meter long storage rings with MPD and SPD placed in the middle of the opposite straight sections. Magnetic rigidity is up to 45 Tesla-meters, residual gas pressure in the beam chamber is below 10^{−10} Torr, maximum field in the dipole magnets – 1.8 T, kinetic energy of gold nuclei – 1.0 to 4.5 GeV/n. The beams are combined and separated in the vertical plane. Upon passing the section bringing them together, the particle bunches in the upper and lower rings travel along a common straight trajectory toward each other to collide at MPD and SPD. Single-aperture lenses are installed along the final focus sections to provide that both beams are focused at SPD and MPD.

MPD facility is designed to study hadron matter at high temperatures and densities, where nucleons "melt" releasing their constituent quarks and gluons and forming a new state, the quark-gluon plasma.

SPD facility allows to collide the polarized beams of protons and deuterons to study the particle spin physics.

== Construction ==
By 2013, an international tender for scientific equipment supply was completed selecting five core suppliers. Up to 2019, most of the equipment has been delivered and mounted. First tests began in late 2019. The construction that was initially scheduled to end in 2016 is now, as of 2020, to be accomplished by 2022.
