= Dmitry Blokhintsev =

Soviet physicist (1907–1979)

- Блохи́нцев, Дми́трий Ива́нович
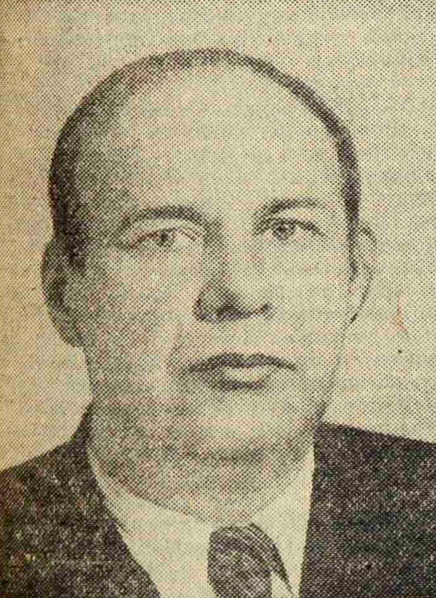
- Born: Blokhintsev, Dmitry Ivanovich; Блохи́нцев, Дми́трий Ива́нович; 11 January 1907; Moscow, Russian Empire
- Died: 27 January 1979 (aged 72); Dubna, Moscow, Russia in Soviet Union
- Citizenship: Soviet Union
- Education: Moscow State University
- Known for: Soviet program of nuclear weapons
- Awards: Hero of Socialist Labour; Stalin Prize
- Scientific career
- Fields: Physics
- Workplaces: Joint Institute for Nuclear Research; Lebedev Physical Institute; Soviet Academy of Sciences; Obninsk Nuclear Power Plant; International Union of Pure and Applied Physics
- Academic advisors: Igor Tamm

Dmitry Ivanovich Blokhintsev (Russian: Дми́трий Ива́нович Блохи́нцев; 11 January 1907 – 27 January 1979) was a Soviet physicist whose career was mostly spent in advancing the Soviet program of nuclear weapons.

== Biography ==
Blokhintsev was born to the family of an agronomist and from a young age showed interest in engineering. Blochintsev attended the Technical College for Industrial Economics and studied physics at Moscow State University from 1926 to 1930. Among others, he studied with Leonid Mandelstam, Sergei Ivanovich Vavilov, Nikolai Lusin, Dmitri Egorov and Igor Tamm. He then worked at the Research Institute for Applied Chemistry (NIIPh), where he completed his habilitation under Tamm in 1934 (Russian doctorate). In a 1934 paper co-authored with Fyodor Galperin, the term graviton was used for the first time.

In 1935 he moved to the Lebedev Physical Institute (FIAN). At the same time he became a professor of theoretical physics at Moscow State University. When Tamm was temporarily transferred there in 1937, he headed the theory department at FIAN. From 1951 he was head of the nuclear research center at the Obninsk nuclear power plant, where under his leadership the first Soviet prototype nuclear power plant with 5 MW of electrical output went into operation in 1954. Blokhintsev received the Lenin Prize for this in 1957.

Blochintsev is also known as the author of a quantum mechanics textbook and he also wrote a book on the philosophy of quantum mechanics, where he represented an interpretation in the spirit of Marxist–Leninist materialism. His quantum mechanics textbook, first published in 1944, was translated into many languages and he received the Stalin Prize for it. In addition to reactor physics and quantum mechanics, he dealt with many other areas of physics such as solid state physics, nuclear physics, quantum field theory, nonlinear optics and acoustics. In 1938 he presented the derivation of the Lamb shift in a seminar, using a similar approach as Hans Bethe later did in his well-known work. Since the Journal for Experimental and Theoretical Physics refused publication, his contribution did not appear in a collection of his work until 1958. During the Second World War he became a leading acoustics expert, including for the localization of submarines and aircraft using acoustic means.

From 1956 to 1965 he was the first director of the Nuclear Research Institute and from 1965 head of the Laboratory for Theoretical Physics in Dubna. In Dubna, a pulsed reactor (IBR) designed by Blokhintsev in the mid-1950s was put into operation in 1960, followed in 1984 by the IBR-2, as a neutron source for solid-state research.

Blokhintsev was a corresponding member of the Soviet Academy of Sciences from 1958. He was scientific advisor to the UN Secretary General and from 1963 Vice President and 1966 to 1969 President of the International Union of Pure and Applied Physics (IUPAP). In 1964 he was elected a member of the Leopoldina. He was a corresponding member of the Ukrainian Academy of Sciences.
