= Vladimir Veksler =

Soviet experimental physicist

- Born: Владимир Иосифович Векслер; March 4, 1907; Zhitomir, Volhynia Governorate, Russian Empire (now Ukraine)
- Died: September 22, 1966 (aged 59); Moscow, Russian SFSR, Soviet Union
- Education: Moscow Power Engineering Institute
- Known for: synchrotron, proton accelerator, cosmic ray
- Awards: Stalin Prize (1951); Atoms for Peace Award (1963); Lenin Prize (1959)
- Scientific career
- Fields: physics
- Workplaces: Lebedev Physical Institute; Joint Institute for Nuclear Research; Soviet Academy of Sciences
- Doctoral advisor: Sergey Ivanovich Vavilov
- Doctoral students: Alexander Prokhorov

Vladimir Iosifovich Veksler (Russian: Владимир Иосифович Векслер; Ukrainian: Володимир Йосипович Векслер; March 4, 1907 – September 22, 1966) was a Soviet experimental physicist who invented the microtron. He was head of the Nuclear Physics Department of the Academy of Sciences of the Soviet Union.

== Biography ==
Veksler was born in Zhitomir on March 4, 1907, in the Russian Empire (now Ukraine) to a Jewish family. Veksler's family moved from Zhitomir to Moscow in 1915. In 1931 he graduated from the Moscow Power Engineering Institute. He began working at the Lebedev Physical Institute in 1936, and became involved in particle detector development and the study of cosmic rays. He participated in a number of expeditions to the Pamir Mountains and to Mount Elbrus, which were devoted to the study of cosmic ray composition. In 1944, he began working in the field of accelerator physics, where he became famous for the invention of the microtron, and the development of the synchrotron in independence to Edwin McMillan, pursuing the development of modern particle accelerators.

In 1956 he established and became the first director of the Laboratory of High Energy at the Joint Institute for Nuclear Research in Dubna, where the Synchrophasotron, that, along with an accelerator at the Institute for High Energy Physics in Protvino, incorporated the largest circular proton accelerators in the world at their time, was constructed under his leadership.

From 1946 to 1957, he was a corresponding member of the Academy of Sciences of the Soviet Union. Veksler became a full member of the academy in 1958. In 1963 he was appointed head of the Nuclear Physics Department of the academy. In 1965, Veksler established the journal Nuclear Physics (Yadernaya Fizika) and became its first editor-in-chief.

The Russian Academy of Sciences established in 1994 the V. I. Veksler Prize for outstanding achievement in accelerator physics (and in 1991 awarded the V. I. Veksler Gold Medal to Alexander N. Skrinsky). Streets in Dubna, Odesa, Zhytomyr and CERN are named in Veksler's honour.

== Awards ==
He received numerous honours, including the Stalin Prize in 1951, the American Atoms for Peace Award in 1963 and the Lenin Prize in 1959.

== See also ==
- Synchrophasotron
- U-70 (synchrotron)
