= Synchrophasotron =

Particle accelerator

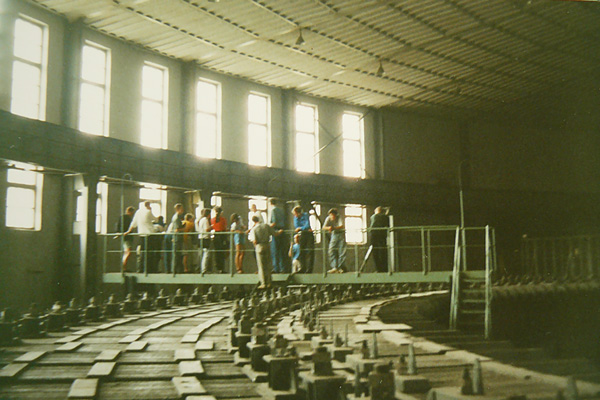
View from above the Synchrophasotron magnet yoke

The Synchrophasotron was a synchrotron-based particle accelerator for protons at the Joint Institute for Nuclear Research in Dubna that was operational from 1957 to 2003. It was designed and constructed under supervision of Vladimir Veksler, who had invented the synchrotron independently from Edwin McMillan.

Its final energy for protons, and later deuterium nuclei, was 10 GeV.
