= Aurélien Barrau =

French physicist and philosopher

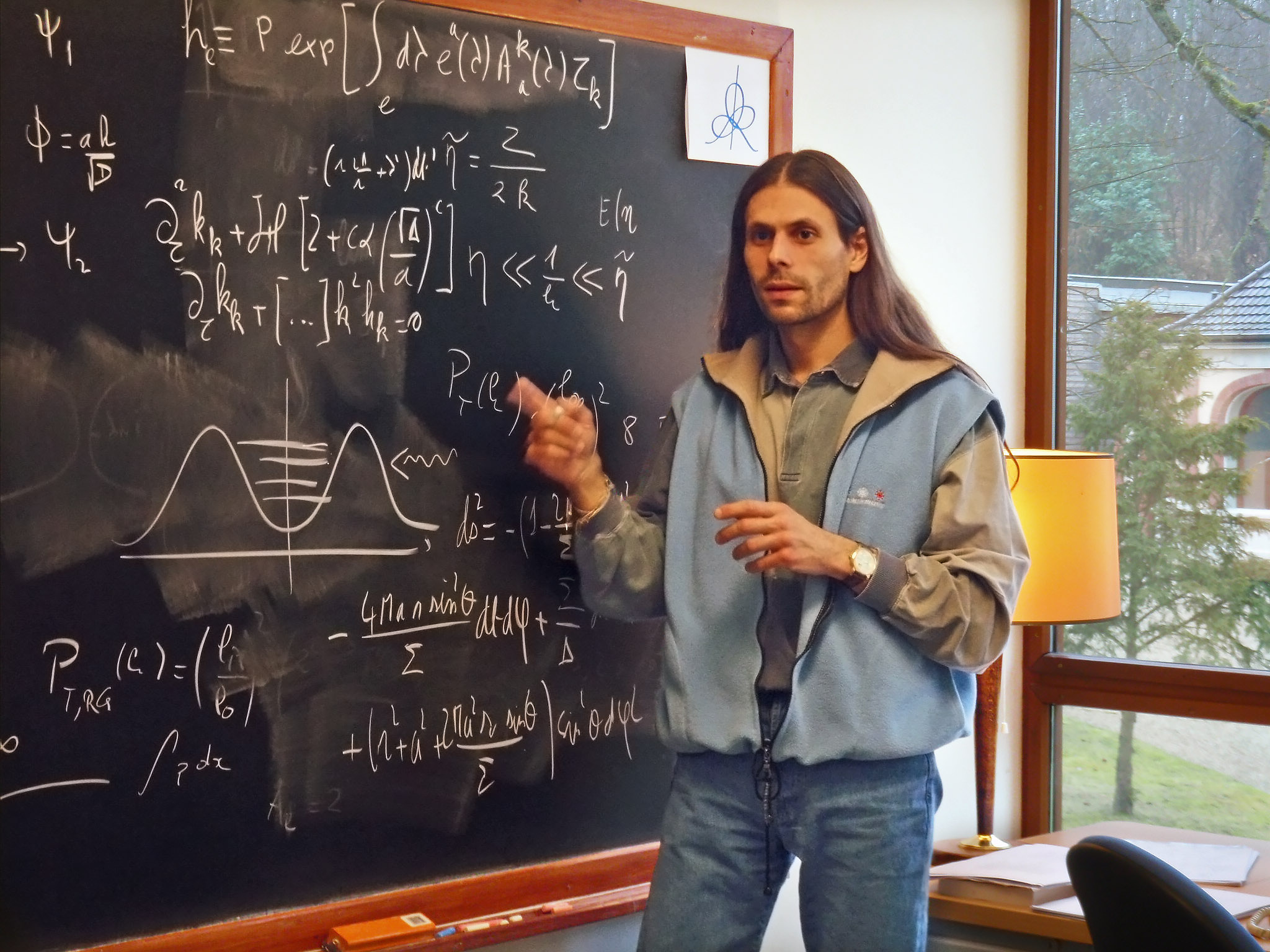
Aurélien Barrau

Aurélien Barrau (born 19 May 1973, in Neuilly-sur-Seine) is a French physicist and philosopher, specialized in astroparticle physics, black holes and cosmology. He is the director of the Grenoble Center for Theoretical Physics, works in the CNRS Laboratory for Subatomic Physics and Cosmology (LPSC), and is a professor at the Joseph Fourier University (now the Université Grenoble Alpes).

He was awarded the 2006 Bogoliubov Prize in theoretical physics for his research on quantum black holes and primordial cosmology. He was awarded the 2012 European Thibaud prize in subatomic physics. He is a junior member of the Institut Universitaire de France (IUF). He was awarded the Joseph Fourier University medal in 2010. He was invited both at the Institut des Hautes Études Scientifiques (France) and at the Institute for Advanced Study (Princeton) as a visitor. He is member of the French national scientific council and referee for many international research agencies.

He has written more than 100 refereed research articles. After working on gamma-ray astrophysics and large-field surveys (LSST), he obtained new results in quantum cosmology and about the evaporation of black holes. His main recent contributions are focused on the early universe, especially in bouncing models, and on a local perspective on quantum properties of black holes. He also proposed original hypotheses for dark matter and the behavior of the Universe around the Big Bang. He worked on both loop quantum gravity and string theory.

He is involved in scientific popularization, collaborates with artists (Olafur Eliasson, Michelangelo Pistoletto) and film makers (Claire Denis). He is a member of the editorial board of literature and poetry journals (Hors-Sol, Diacritik).

He is also PhD in philosophy from Paris-Sorbonne University and has written books and articles with the French philosopher Jean-Luc Nancy. He worked on metaphysical questions about truth and multiplicity. He has published 2 poetry books.

In 2019, with the actress Juliette Binoche, he launched a call to fight the ecological crisis. The text was signed by many scientists, together with artists like Patti Smith or Wim Wenders. In 2020, he wrote a second international tribune, signed by 20 Nobel Prize winners and many stars, explicitly saying that we are facing a systemic problem. The text also says that "the pursuit of consumerism and an obsession with productivity have led us to deny the value of life itself".

== Books (in French) ==
- Forme et Origine de l'Univers, Paris, Dunod, 2010
- Multivers, Paris, La Ville Brûle, 2010
- Relativité Générale, Paris, Dunod, 2011 (with J. Grain)
- Dans quels mondes vivons nous ?, Paris, Galilée, 2011 (with J.-L. Nancy)
- Variations sur un même ciel, Paris, La Ville Brûle, 2010 (J.-P. Uzan et al.)
- Big Bang et au-delà, Paris, Dunod, 2012
- Des univers multiples, Paris, Dunod, 2014
- De la vérité dans les sciences, Paris, Dunod, 2015
- Au coeur des trous noirs, Paris, Dunod, 2017
- L'Animal est-il un homme comme les autres, Paris, Dunod, 2018
- Le plus grand défi de l'histoire de l'humanité, Paris, Dunod, 2018
- Météorites, Paris, Dunod, 2020
- Il faut une révolution politique, poétique et philosophique, Paris, Zulma, 2021
- Anomalies cosmiques, Paris, Dunod, 2022
- L'hypothèse K, Paris, Grasset, 2023
- Trahir par fidélité, Paris, Les liens qui libèrent, 2026

== Books (in English) ==
- What's These Worlds Coming To?, with J.-L. Nancy, Fordham University Press, 2014

== External links and sources in English ==
- Research articles
- CERN Courier popularization article on microscopic black holes
- CERN Courier popularization article on the Multiverse
- Home page of Aurelien Barrau
- The call "Please, let’s not go back to normal"
