= Vladimir Kadyshevsky =

Russian theoretical physicist

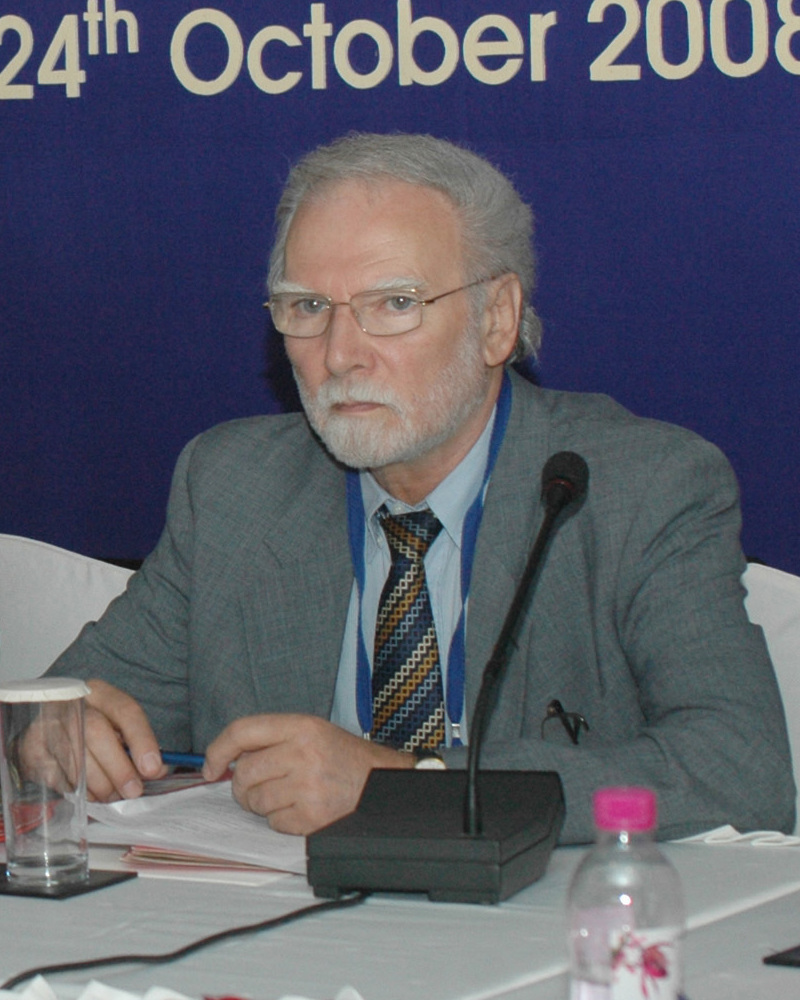
Portrait of Vladimir Kadyshevsky in 2008

Vladimir Georgievich Kadyshevsky (5 May 1937 – 24 September 2014) was a Russian theoretical physicist.

== Biography ==
Kadyshevsky was born on 5 May 1937 in Moscow. He studied at the Suvorov Military School in Sverdlovsk from 1946 to 1954, before entering the physics department of the Lomonosov Moscow State University (MSU).

He graduated in 1960 and continued his studies as a postgraduate under Nikolay Bogolyubov. He successfully defended his PhD thesis in 1962, before starting work at the Laboratory of Theoretical Physics of JINR.

In 1977-78 he headed the group of Soviet physicists working at Fermilab.

In 1983-85 he was leader of JINR’s programme for the DELPHI experiment at CERN’s LEP collider.

He was director of the JINR Laboratory of Theoretical Physics from 1987 to 1992, and director of JINR from 1992 to 2005.
