= Bogolyubov Prize for young scientists =

The Bogoliubov Prize for young scientists is an award offered to young researchers in theoretical physics by the Joint Institute for Nuclear Research (JINR), an international intergovernmental organization located in Dubna, Russia. The award is issued in memory of the physicist and mathematician Nikolay Bogoliubov.

The prize is awarded to young (up to 33-year-old) researchers for "outstanding contributions in fields of theoretical physics related to Bogoliubov's scientific interests". The awardee is one who has demonstrated "early scientific maturity" and whose results are recognized worldwide and peer-reviewed. The laureates generally emulate Bogoliubov's own skill in using sophisticated mathematics to attempt to solve concrete physical problems (mostly in the fields of nonlinear dynamics, statistical physics, quantum field theory and elementary particle physics).

== Jury ==
The jury is presided by the theoretical physicist Dmitry Shirkov, who co-authored many works with Nikolay Bogoliubov.

== Laureates ==
- 1999 Oleg Shvedov (Moscow State University, Russia): for a series of works on asymptotical methods in statistical physics and quantum field theory.
- 2001 Evgenii Ivashkevich (JINR, Russia): for a series of works on analytical methods in non-equilibrium statistical mechanics.
- 2005 Aurélien Barrau (the Laboratory of sub-atomic physics and cosmology and Joseph Fourier University, Grenoble, France): for a series of works on astrophysics and cosmology.

== See also ==
- List of physics awards
