= Microtron =

Type of particle accelerator

Particles in a classic microtron get emitted from a source (blue), accelerated once per turn (microwave cavity, gray), increasing their path radius until ejection.

A microtron is a type of particle accelerator concept originating from the cyclotron in which the accelerating field is not applied through large D-shaped electrodes, but through a linear accelerator structure. The classic microtron was invented by Vladimir Veksler around 1944. The kinetic energy of the particles is increased by a constant amount per field change (one half or a whole revolution). Microtrons are designed to operate at constant cavity frequency and magnetic field in the ultrarelativistic limit. Thus they are especially suited for very light elementary particles, namely electrons.

In a microtron, due to the electrons' increasing momentum, the particle paths are different for each pass. The time needed for that is proportional to the pass number. The slow electrons need one electric field oscillation, the faster electrons need an integer multiple of this oscillation.

== Racetrack microtron ==
Particles in a racetrack microtron, coming from an external source.

A racetrack microtron is a larger-scale microtron which uses two electromagnets instead of one. Both electromagnets supply a homogeneous magnetic field in a half-circle formed region, and the particles path between both magnets is thus straight. One advantage of this is that the accelerator cavity can be larger, enabling the use of different linear accelerator (linac) forms, and is not installed in a region with large magnetic fields.

The linac is placed near the edge of the gap between the dee-shaped magnets. The remainder of the gap is used for focusing devices. The electron is readmitted to the linac after each revolution. This procedure can be repeated until the increasing radius of the particle's path makes further acceleration impossible. The particle beam is then deflected into an experiment area or a further accelerator stage. The world's largest racetrack-microtron is the Mainz Microtron.

== Applications ==
Microtrons provide high-energy electron beams with a low beam emittance (no radiation equilibrium) and a high repetition rate (equal to the operation frequency of the linac).
