= Nikolay Govorun =

Soviet mathematician (1930–1989)

Nikolay Nikolayevich Govorun (1930–1989) was a Soviet mathematician known best for his contributions to computational mathematics.

== Bibliography ==
- Николай Николаевич Говорун (1930—1989). Дубна, Объединенный институт ядерных исследований (Библиография научных работ Н. Н. Говоруна). 1990.
- Николай Николаевич Говорун. Книга воспоминаний. Под общей редакцией В. П. Ширикова, Е. М. Молчанова. Сост. А. Г. Заикина, Т. А. Стриж. Дубна, Объединенный институт ядерных исследований, 1999.
