= Dubna =

Town in Moscow Oblast, Russia

Dubna Дубна
- City
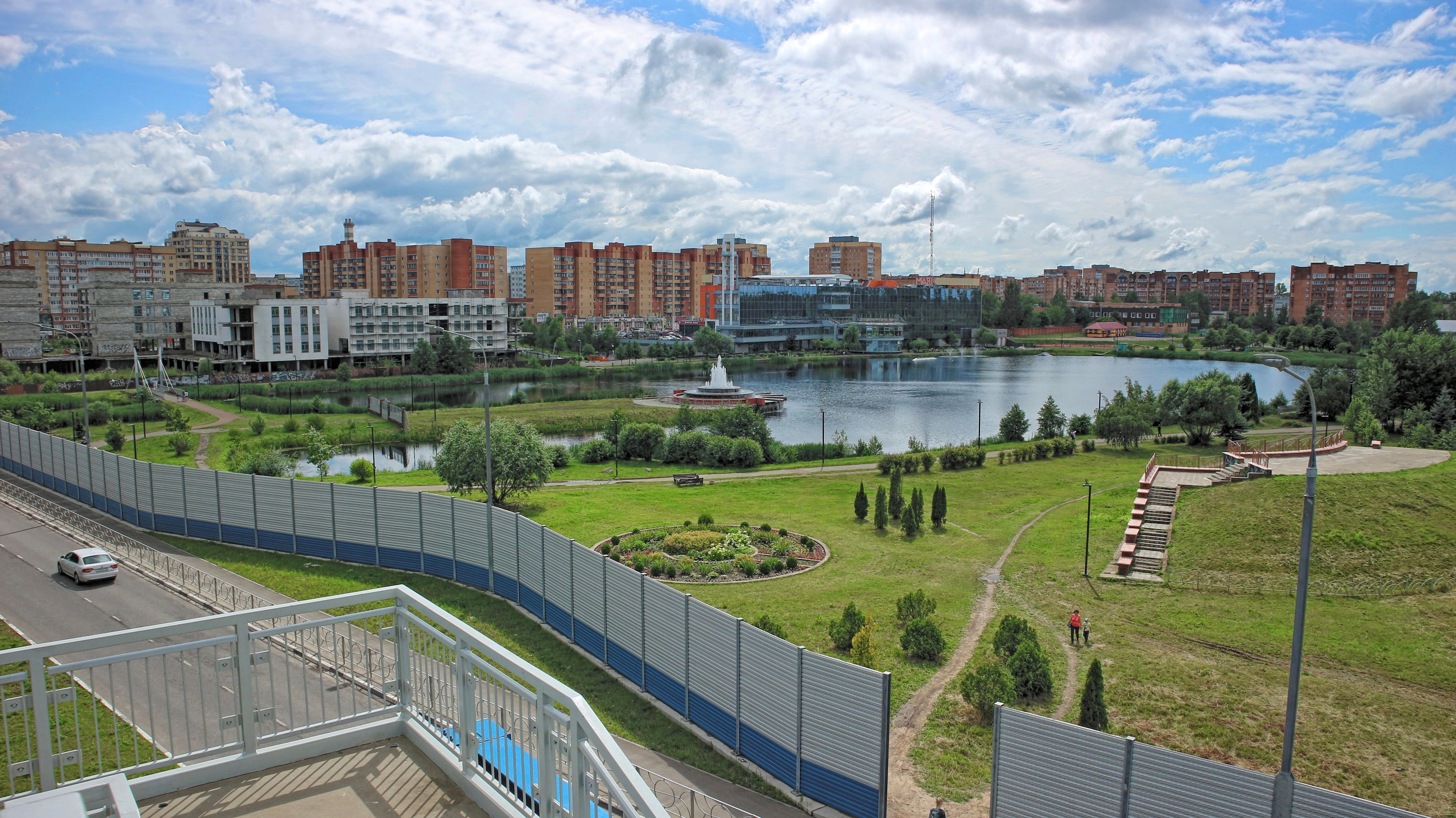

- Flag Coat of arms
- Interactive map of Dubna
- Location of Dubna Dubna (Moscow Oblast)
- Coordinates: 56°44′11″N 37°09′45″E
- Country: Russia
- Federal subject: Moscow Oblast
- Founded: 1956

Government
  - Mayor: Maxim Tikhomirov
- Elevation: 125 m (410 ft)

Population (2010 Census)
  - Total: 70,663
  - Estimate (2012): 72,357 (+2.4%)
  - Rank: 223rd in 2010

Administrative status
  - Subordinated to: Dubna Town Under Oblast Jurisdiction
  - Capital of: Dubna Town Under Oblast Jurisdiction

Municipal status
  - Urban okrug: Dubna Urban Okrug
  - Capital of: Dubna Urban Okrug
- Time zone: UTC+3 (MSK)
- Postal code: 141980
- Dialing code: +7 49621
- OKTMO ID: 46718000001
- Website: www.naukograd-dubna.ru

Dubna (Russian: Дубна́, IPA: [dʊbˈna]) is a town in Moscow Oblast, Russia, 45 miles (72 km) east of Tver and 69 miles (111 km) north of Moscow. It has a status of naukograd (i.e. town of science), being home to the Joint Institute for Nuclear Research, an international nuclear physics research center and one of the largest scientific foundations in the country. It is also home to MKB Raduga, a defense aerospace company specializing in design and production of missile systems, as well as to the Russia's largest satellite communications center owned by Russian Satellite Communications Company. The modern town was developed in the middle of the 20th century and town status was granted to it in 1956. Population: 70,663 (2010 census); 60,951 (2002 census); 65,805 (1989 Soviet census).

== Geography ==
The town is 120 meters (390 ft) above sea level, situated approximately 125 kilometers (78 mi) north of Moscow, on the Volga River, just downstream from the Ivankovo Reservoir. The reservoir is formed by a hydroelectric dam across the Volga situated within the town borders. The town lies on both banks of the Volga. The western boundary of the town is defined by the Moscow Canal joining the Volga, while the eastern boundary is defined by the Dubna River joining the Volga.

Dubna is the northernmost town of Moscow Oblast.

== History ==
=== Pre-World War II ===
Fortress Dubna (Russian: Дубна) belonging to Rostov-Suzdal Principality was built in the area in 1132 by the order of Yuri Dolgoruki and existed until 1216. The fortress was destroyed during the feudal war between the sons of Vsevolod the Big Nest. The village of Gorodishche (Городище) was located on the right bank of the Volga River and was a part of the Kashin Principality. Dubna customs post (Дубненское мыто) was located in the area and was a part of the Principality of Tver.

Before the October Revolution, few villages were in the area: Podberezye was on the left bank of the Volga, and Gorodishche, Alexandrovka, Ivankovo, Yurkino, and Kozlaki (Russian: Козлаки) were on the right bank.

Right after the Revolution one of the first collective farms was organized in Dubna area.

In 1931, the Orgburo of the Communist Party made a decision to build the Volga-Moscow Canal. Genrikh Yagoda, then the leader of the State Political Directorate, was put in charge of construction. The Canal was completed in 1937. Ivankovo Reservoir and Ivankovo hydroelectrical plant were also created as a part of the project. Many villages and the town Korcheva were submerged under water. Dubna is mentioned in Aleksandr Solzhenitsyn's book The Gulag Archipelago as the town built by Gulag prisoners.

=== Science ===
The decision to build a proton accelerator for nuclear research was taken by the Soviet government in 1946. An impractical place where the current town is situated was chosen due to remoteness from Moscow and the presence of the Ivankovo power plant nearby. The scientific leader was Igor Kurchatov. The general supervisor of the project including construction of a settlement, a road and a railway connecting it to Moscow (largely involving penal labour of Gulag inmates) was the NKVD chief Lavrentiy Beria. After three years of intensive work, the accelerator was commissioned on 13 December 1949.

The town of Dubna was officially inaugurated in 1956, together with the Joint Institute for Nuclear Research (JINR), which has developed into a large international research laboratory involved mainly in particle physics, heavy ion physics, synthesis of transuranium elements, and radiobiology. In 1960, a town of Ivankovo situated on the opposite (left) bank of the Volga was merged into Dubna. In 1964, Dubna hosted the prestigious International Conference on High Energy Physics.

Currently, a construction of the NICA particle collider, a megascience project is underway in Dubna.

Outstanding physicists of the 20th century including Nikolay Bogolyubov, Georgy Flyorov, Vladimir Veksler, and Bruno Pontecorvo used to work at the institute. A number of elementary particles and nuclei of transuranium elements (most recently, element 117 tennessine) have been discovered and investigated there, leading to the honorary naming of chemical element 105 dubnium (Db) for the town.

== Administrative and municipal status ==
Within the framework of administrative divisions, it is incorporated as Dubna Town Under Oblast Jurisdiction—an administrative unit with the status equal to that of the districts. As a municipal division, Dubna Town Under Oblast Jurisdiction is incorporated as Dubna Urban Okrug.

== Demographics ==
Historical population
Year	Pop.	±%
1959	14,000	—
1970	43,700	+212.1%
1979	54,900	+25.6%
1989	65,800	+19.9%
2003	61,000	−7.3%
2008	62,500	+2.5%
2010	70,663	+13.1%
2012	72,357	+2.4%
Source: unless indicated otherwise

== Economics ==
Before the dissolution of the Soviet Union, JINR and MKB Raduga were the main employers in the town. Since then their role has decreased significantly. Several small industrial enterprises have emerged, however the town still experiences some employment difficulties. Proximity to Moscow allows many to commute and work there. Plans by AFK Sistema and other investors including government structures have been announced to build a Russian analogue of Silicon Valley in Dubna. As of the beginning of 2007, nothing has commenced.

=== Transport ===
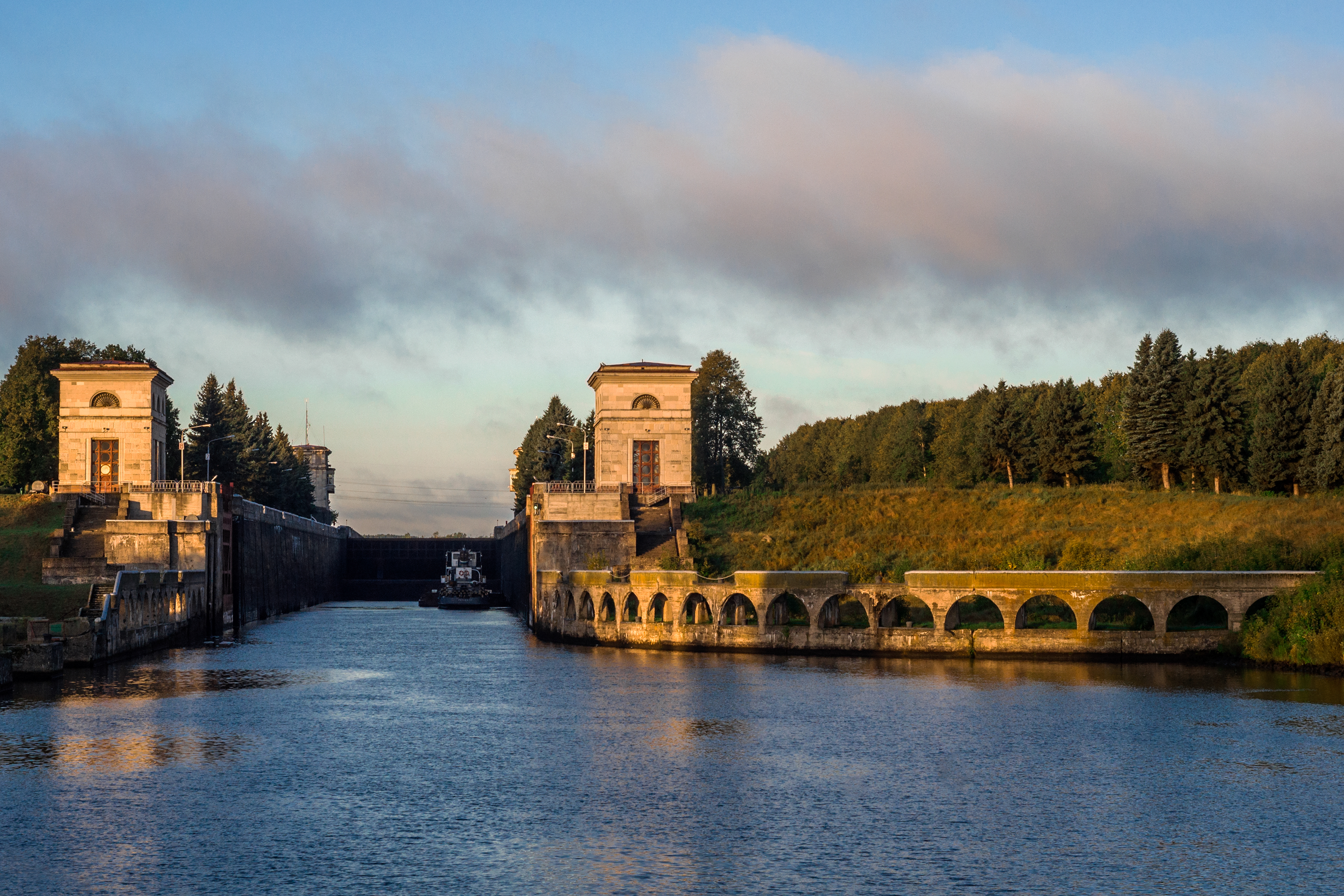
First gate of Moscow Canal

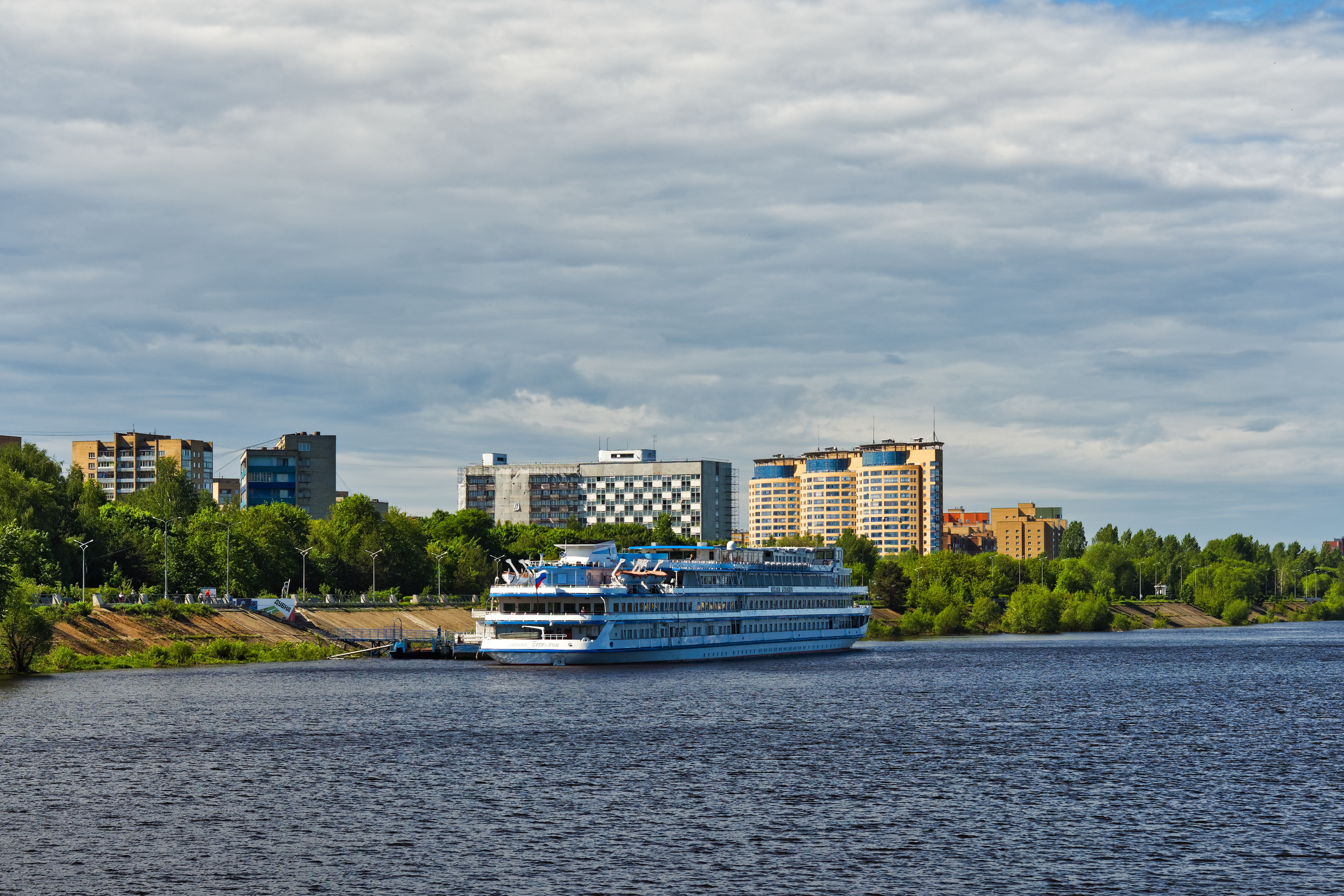
Water transport in Volga

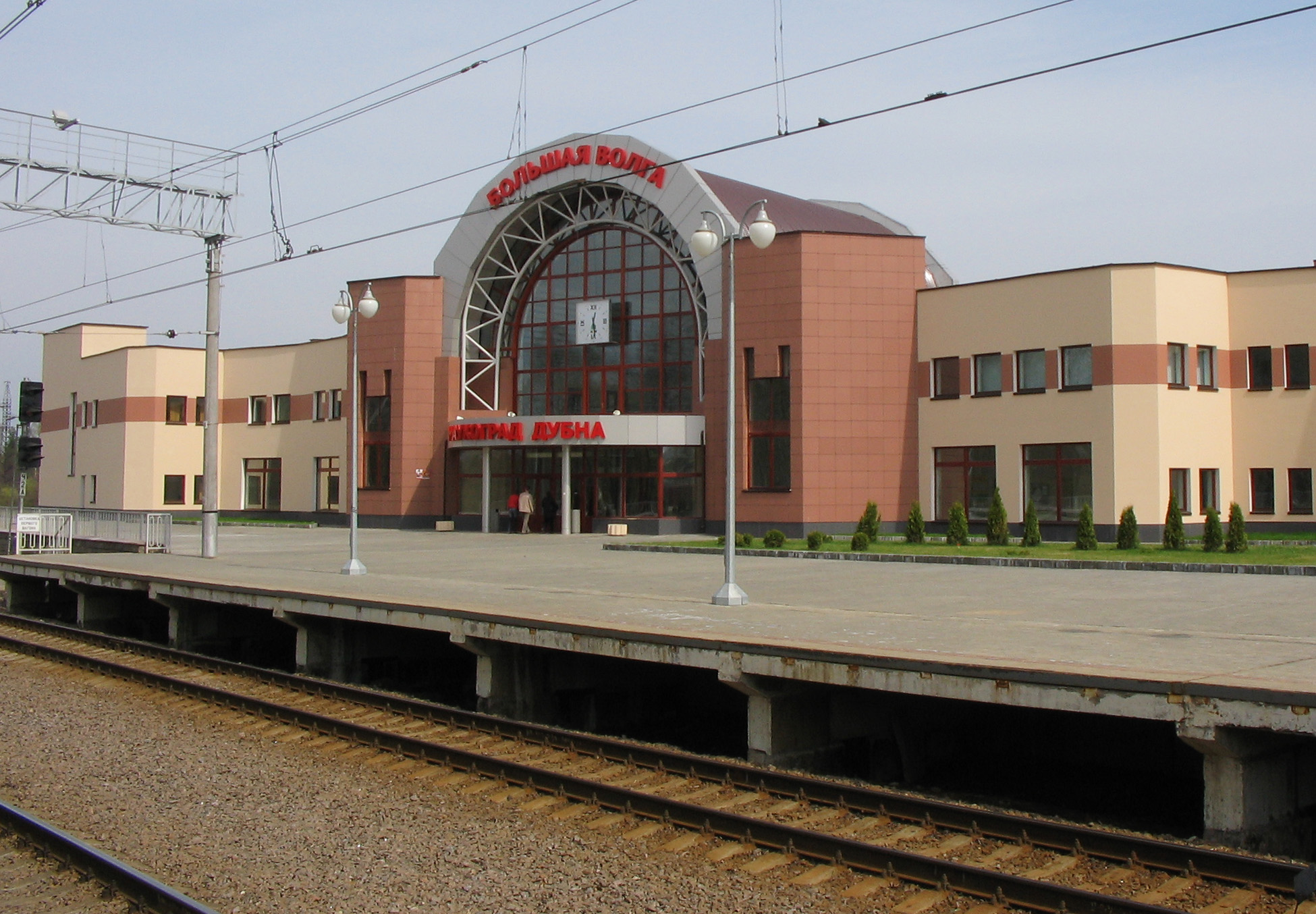
Bolshaya Volga railway station

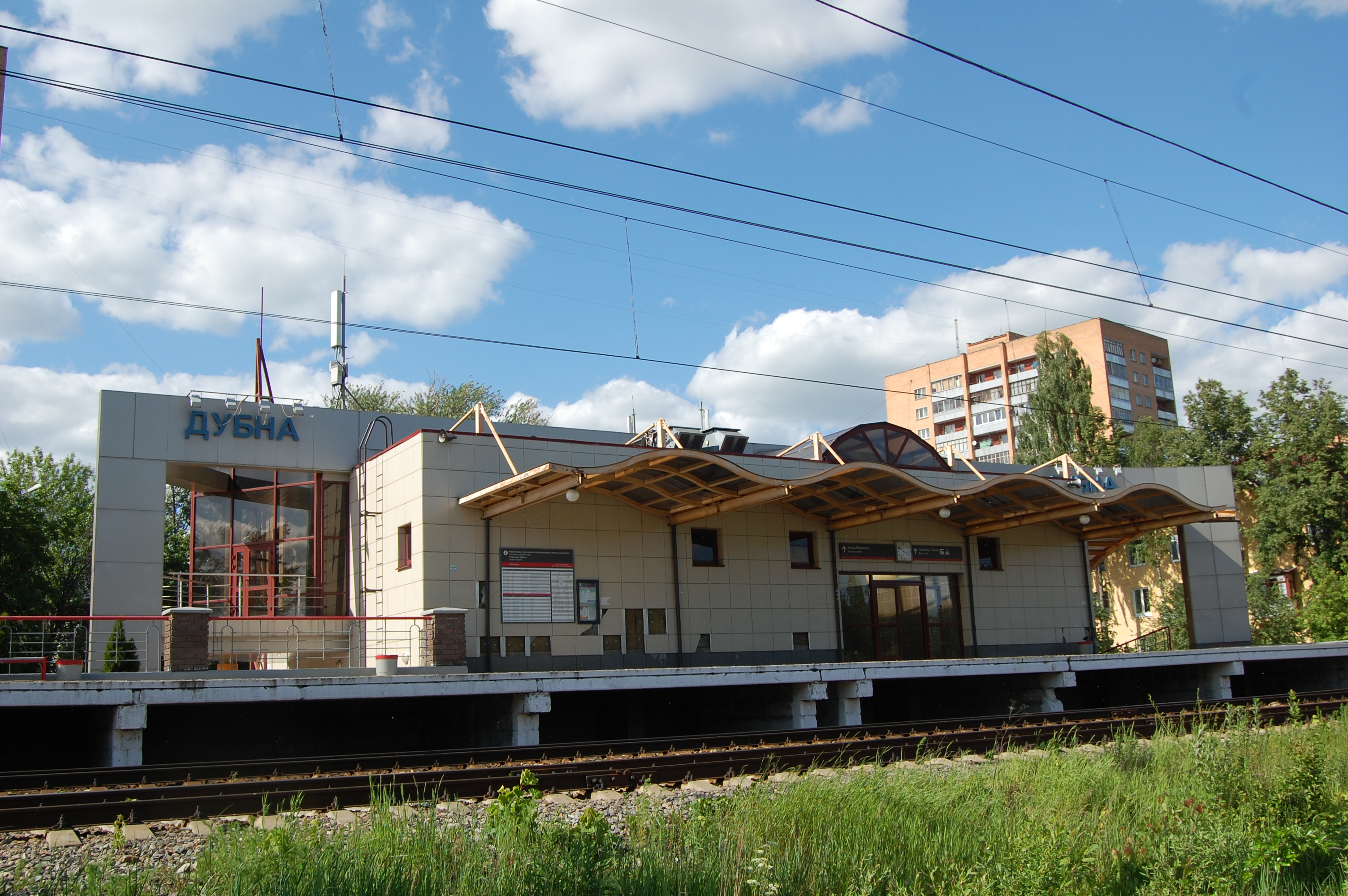
Dubna-2 railway station

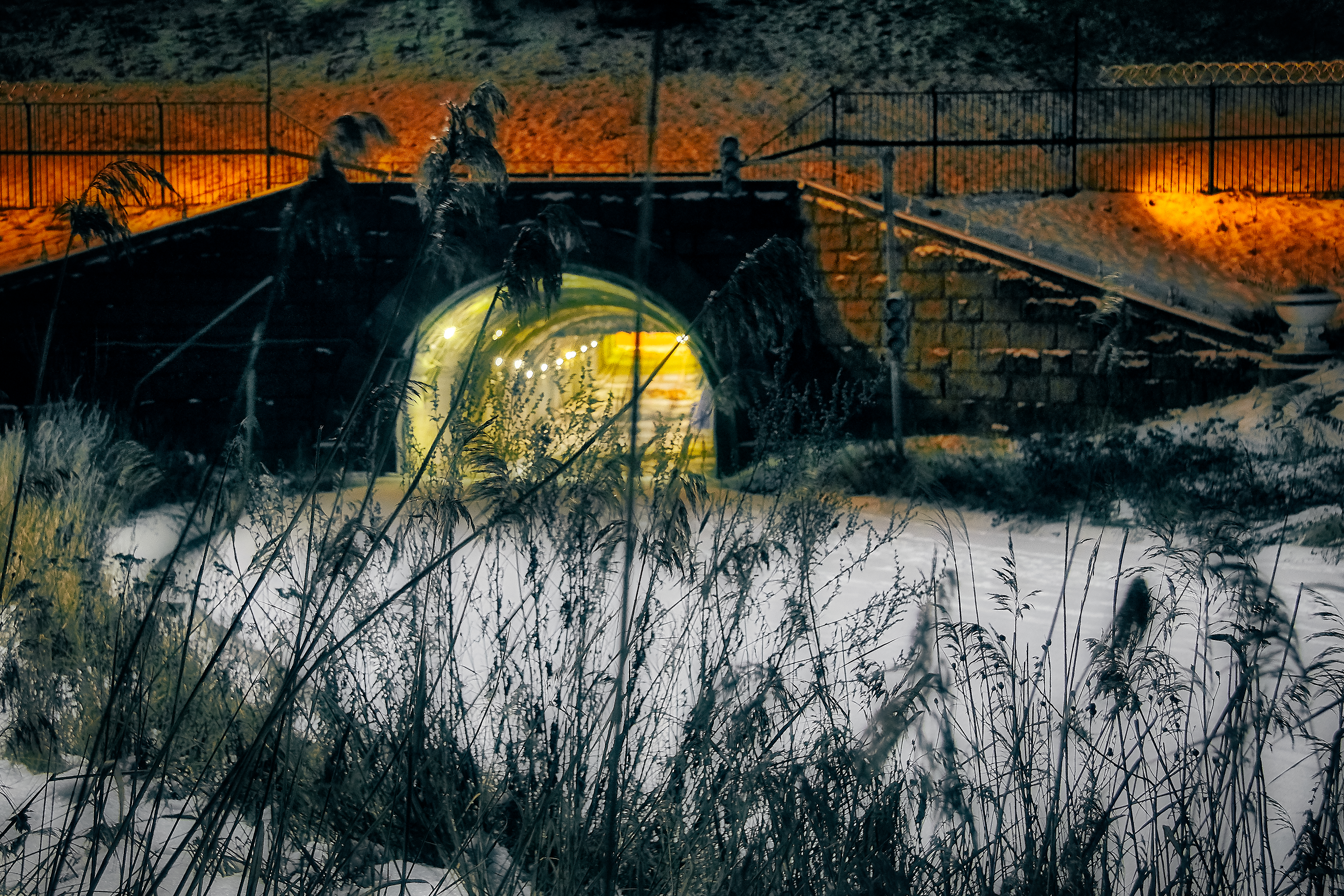
Road tunnel under the Moscow Canal lock

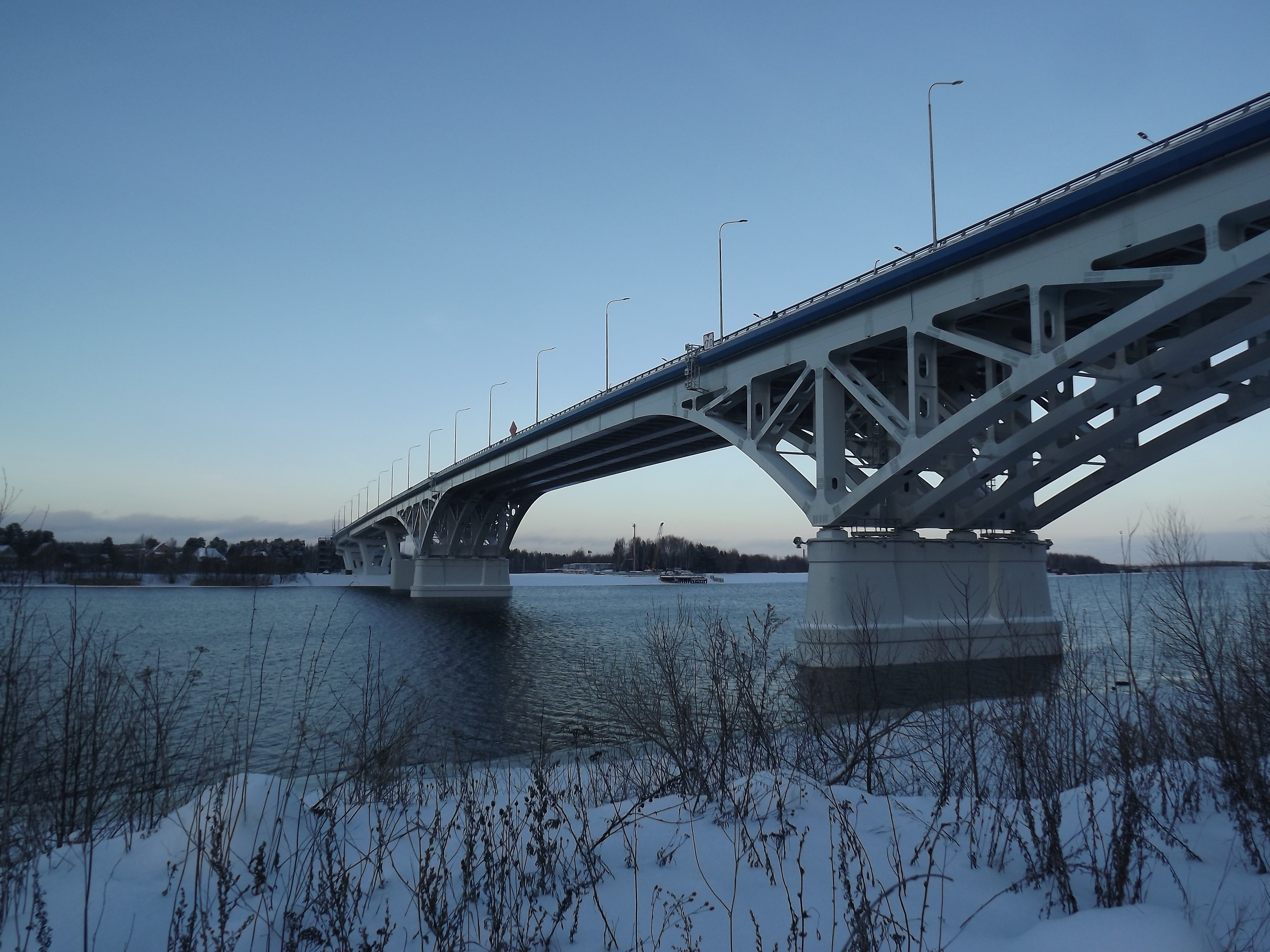
Dubna bridge over Volga

Dubna is the starting point of the Moscow Canal. In addition to the canal, Dubna is connected to Moscow with the А104 highway, and the Savyolovsky suburban railway line provides access to Moscow. Public transport connections to Moscow include express trains, suburban trains, and bus shuttles departing from the Savyolovsky Rail Terminal.

== Culture ==
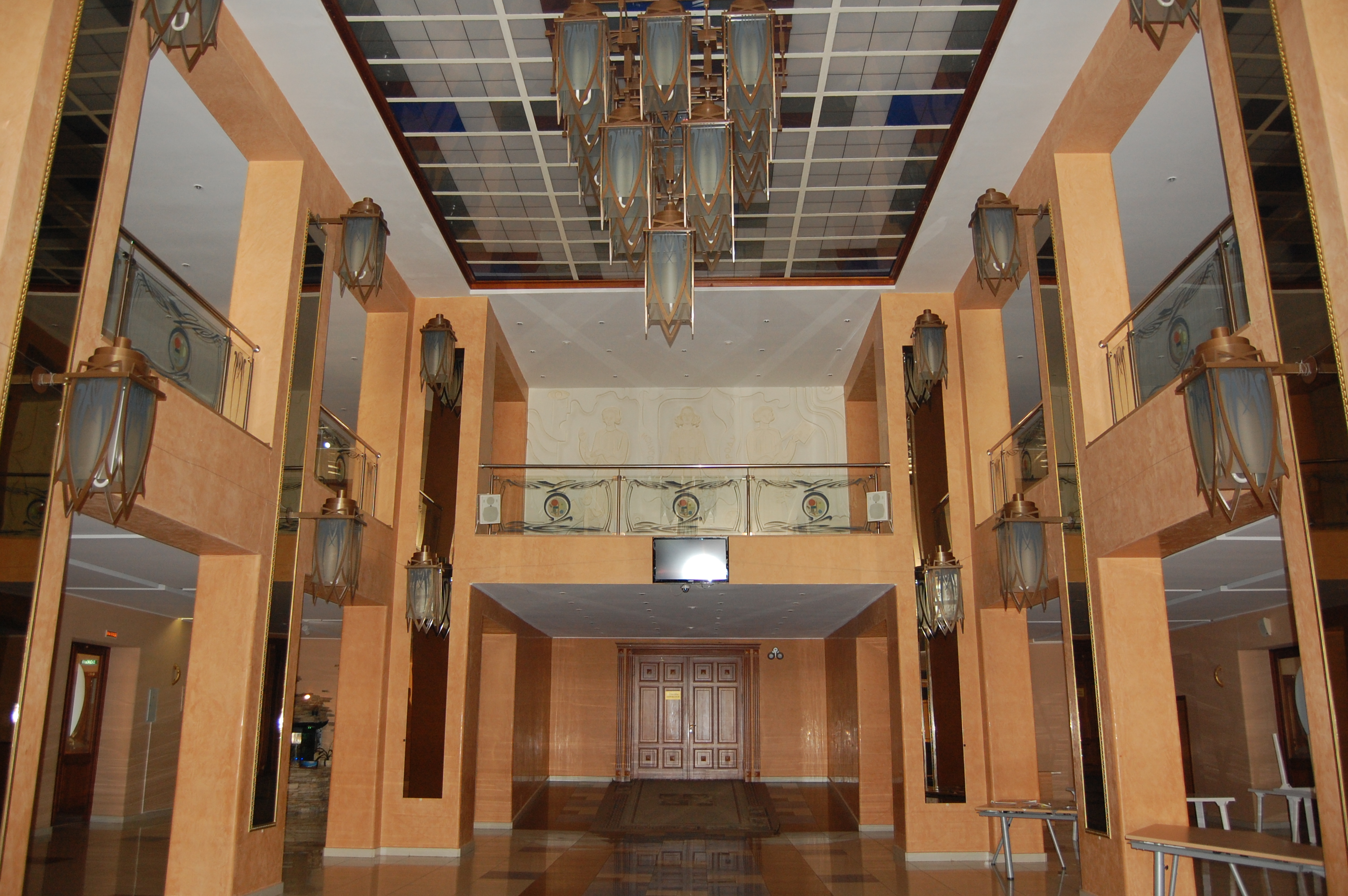
Oktyabr Palace of Culture

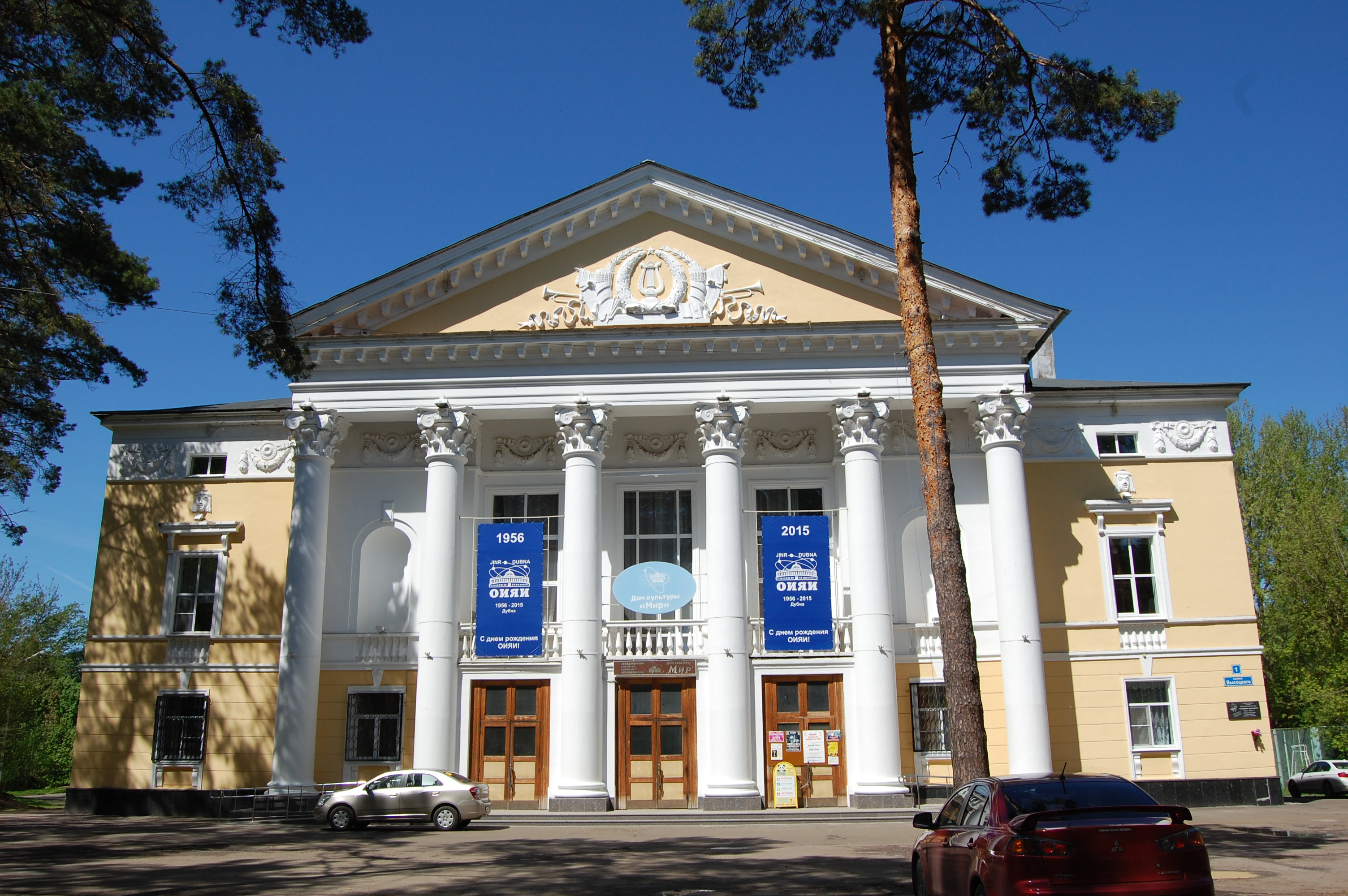
Mir House of Culture

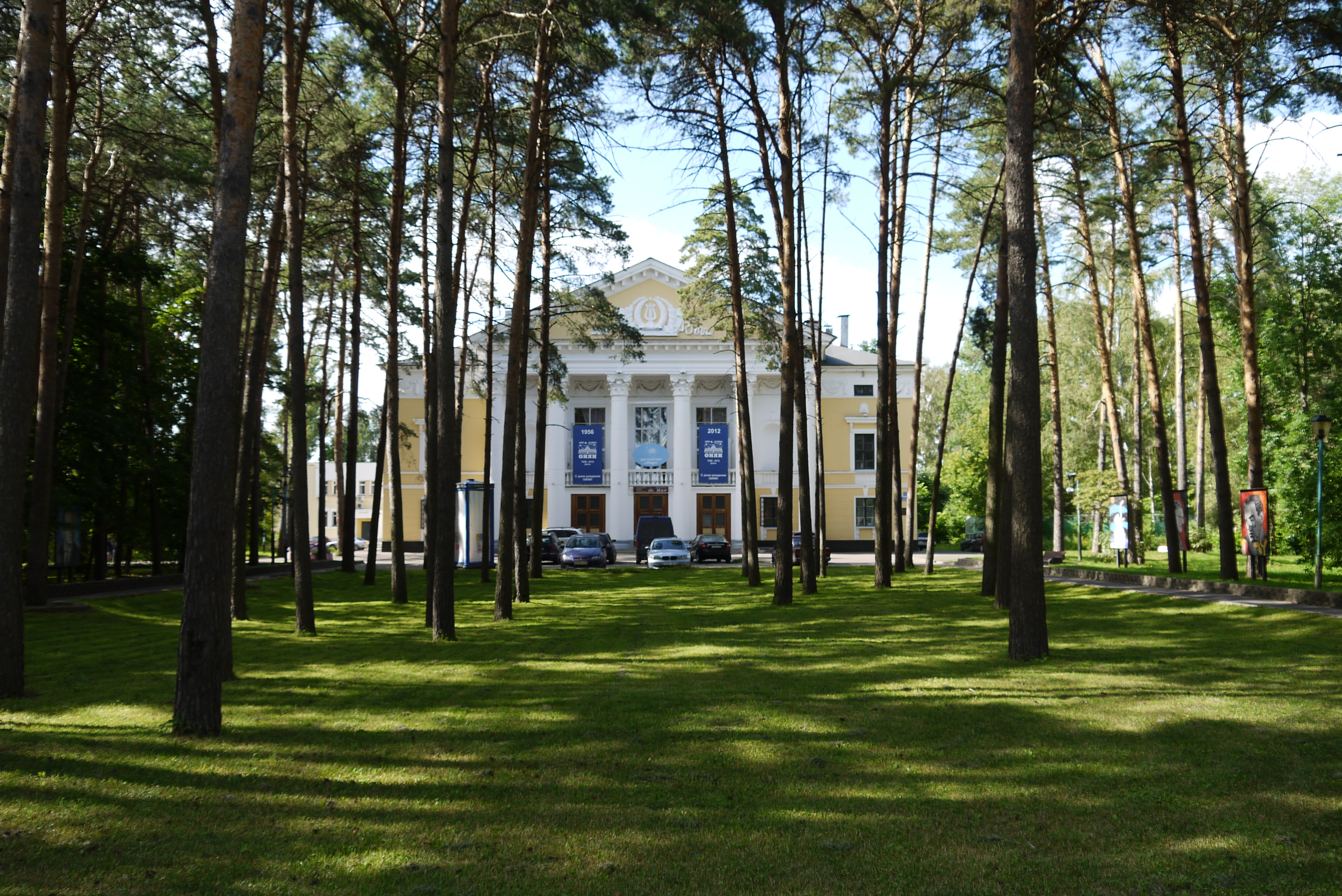
Dubna Theater

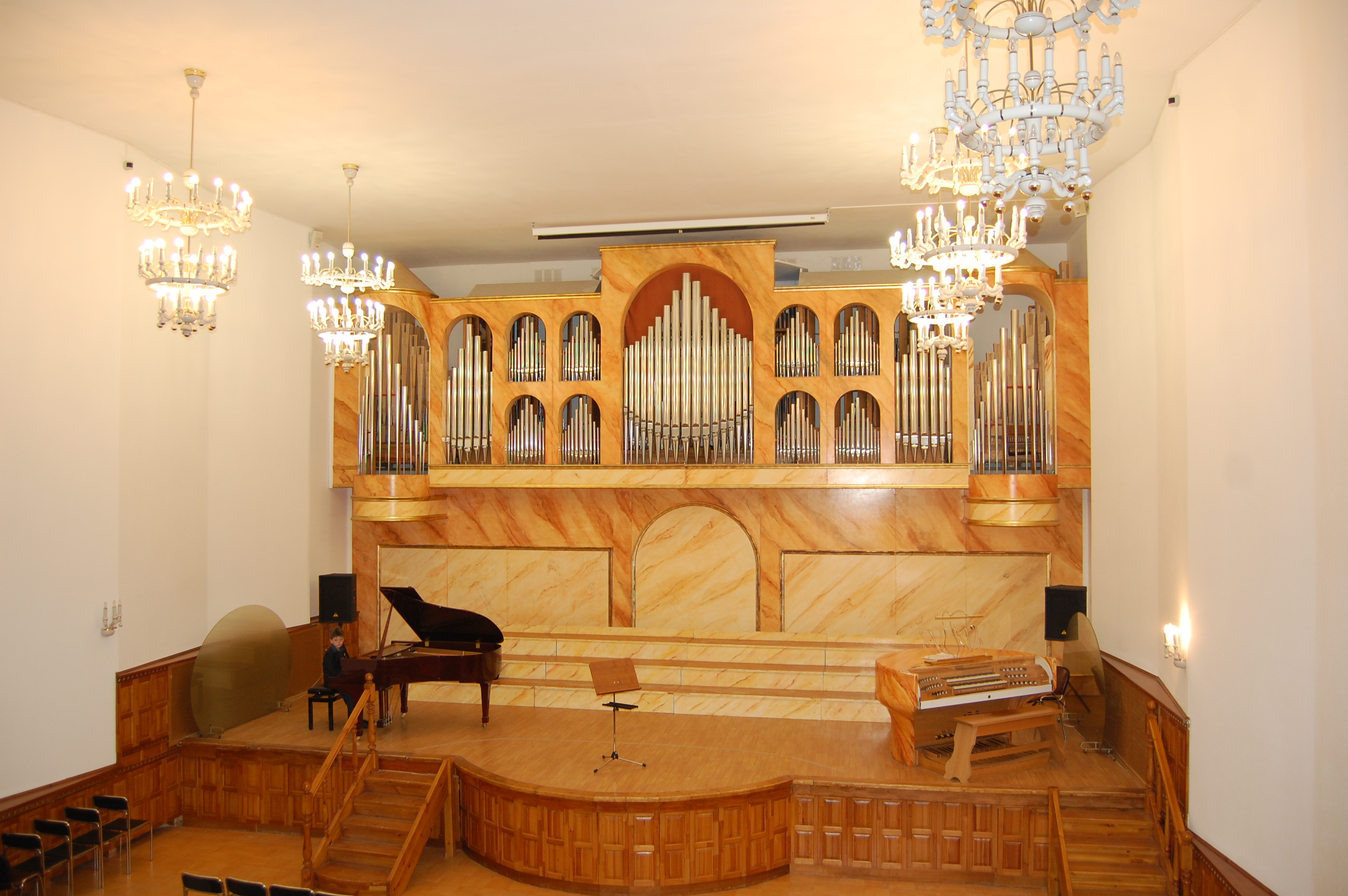
Organ Hall

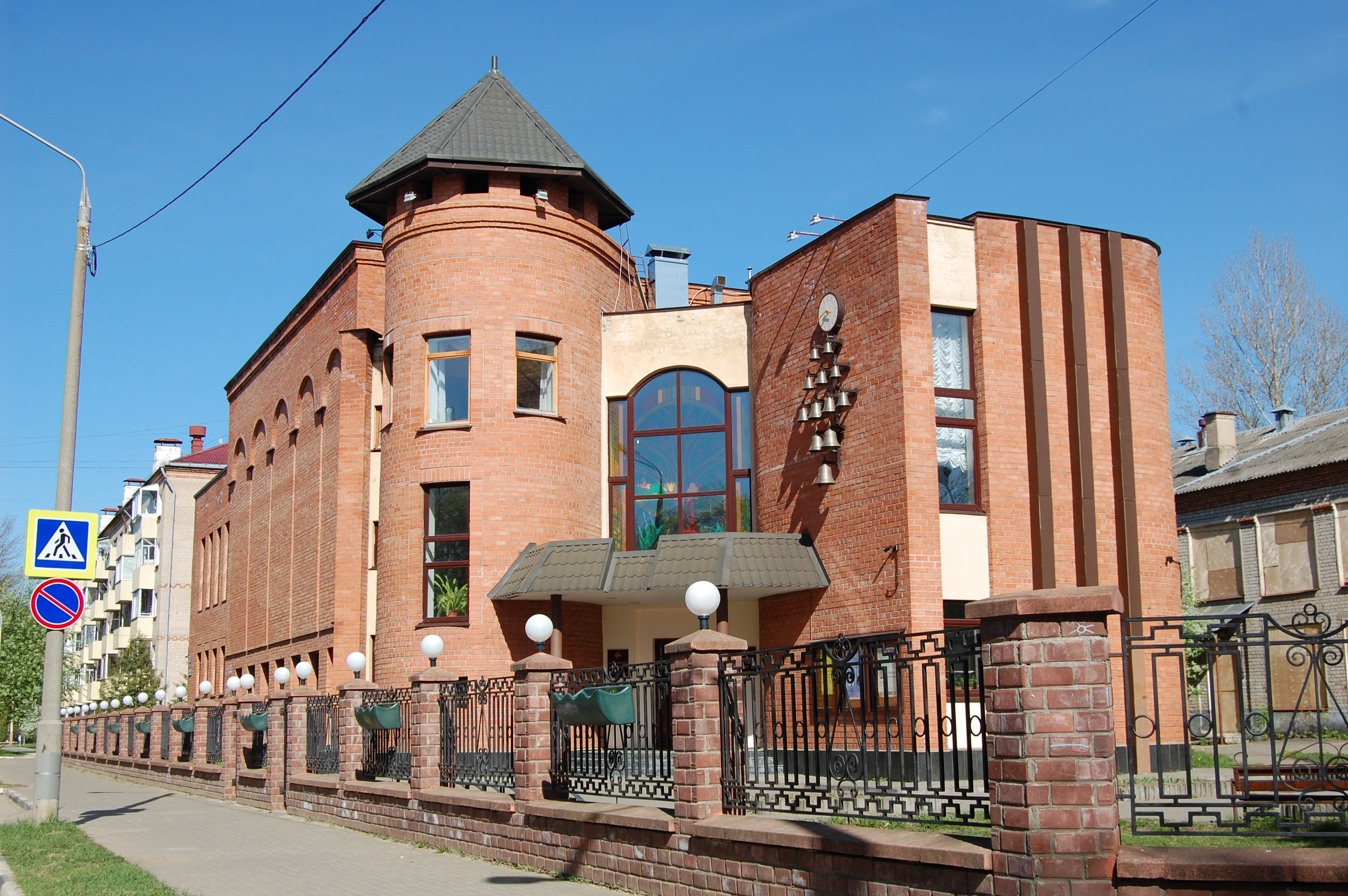
Boys and Youth Choir School

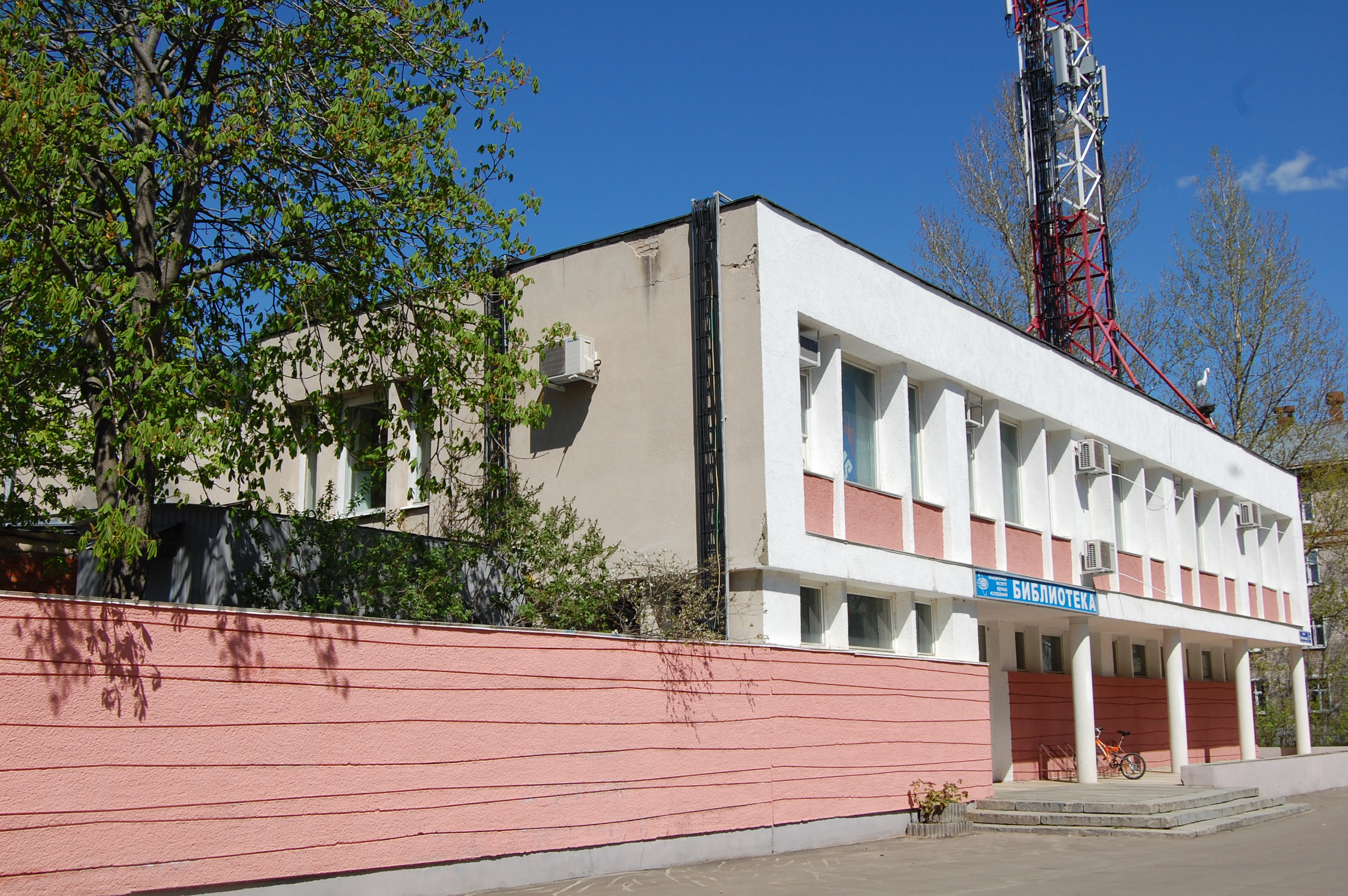
Blokhintsev Library
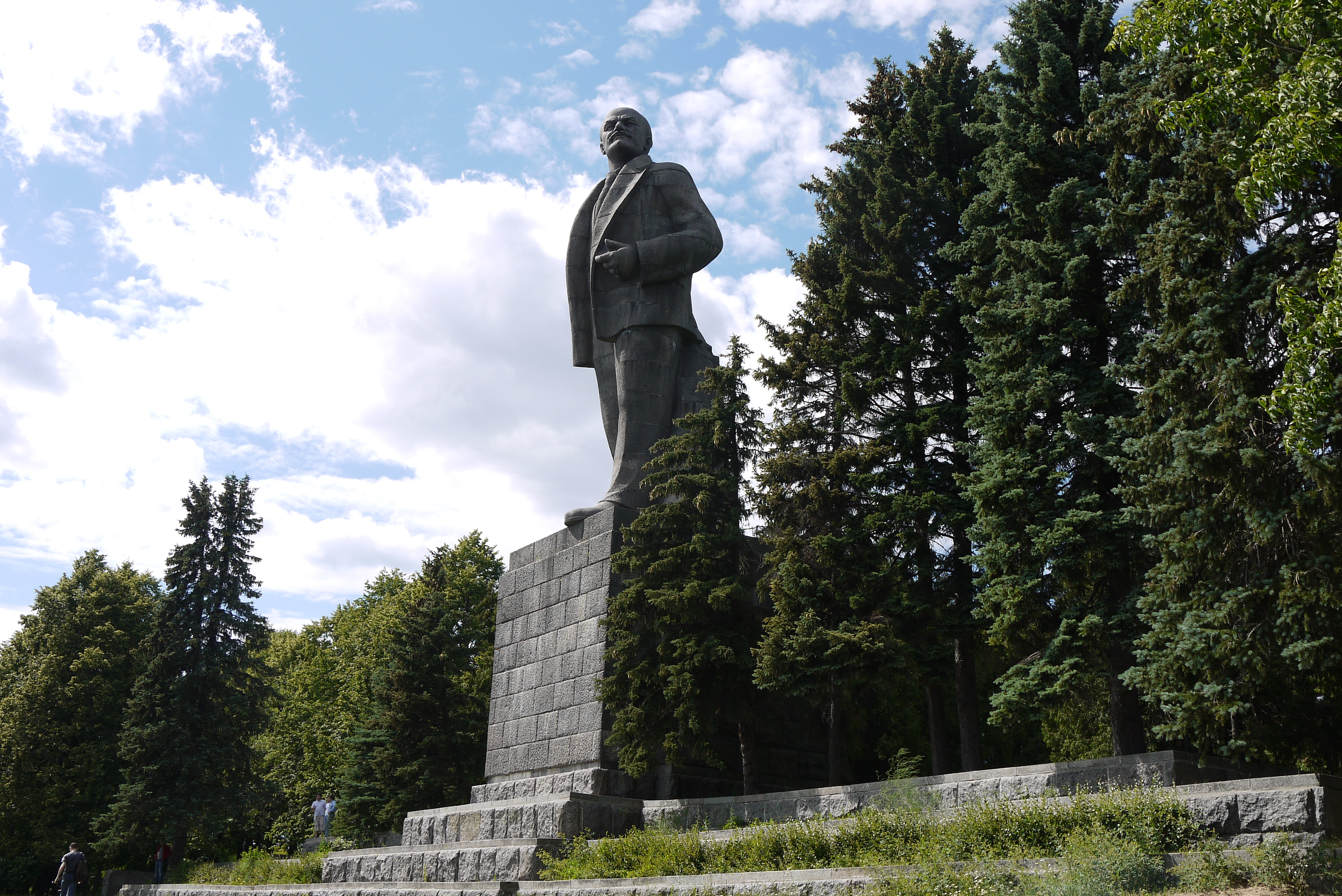
Statue of Vladimir Lenin at Dubna

One of the world's tallest statues of Vladimir Lenin, 25 meters (82 ft) high, built in 1937, is located at Dubna at the confluence of the Volga River and the Moscow Canal. The accompanying statue of Joseph Stalin of similar size was demolished in 1961 during the period of de-stalinization. Among the city's cultural facilities are: the Mir House of Culture, the Oktyabr Palace of Culture, a movie theater, 21 libraries, 4 music schools and a school of arts. In 1990, the Dubna Symphony Orchestra was established.

=== Museums ===
- Museum of Archeology and Local History of Dubna
- JINR Museum of the History of Science and Technology
- Museum of Natural History at Dubna International University
- Museum of Locks
- Museum of Sports
- Svetoch Culturohistorical Center

=== Cinema ===
A variety of movies and miniseries were filmed in the city, such as:

- Volga-Volga (1938)
- Ballad of Siberia (1948)
- Nine Days in One Year (1962)
- All Remains to People (1963)
- Vasili and Vasilisa (1981)
- Katya Ismailova (1994)
- Law of the Lawless (2002)

== Sports ==
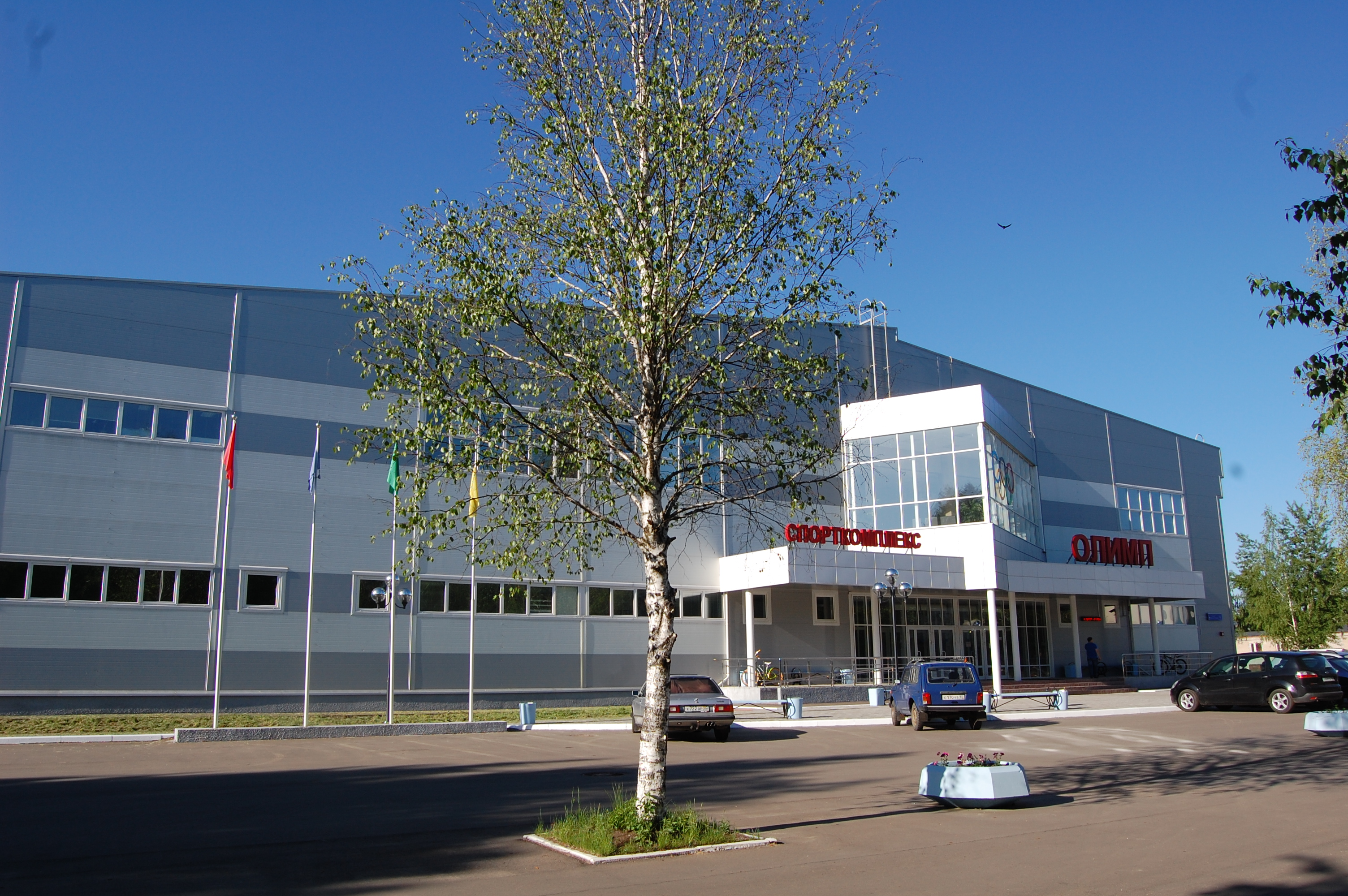
Olympic Sports Complex

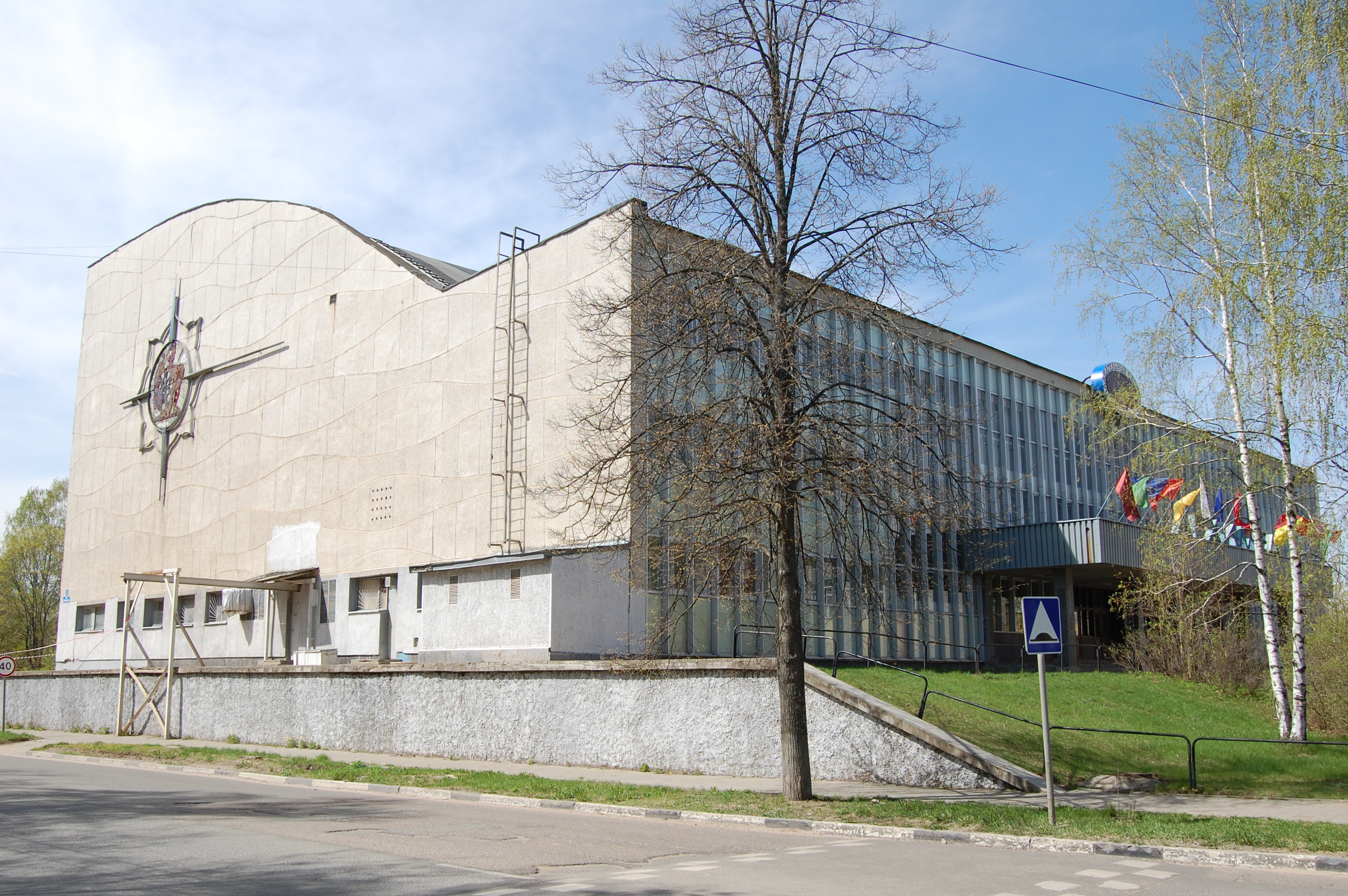
Archimedes Pool of JINR

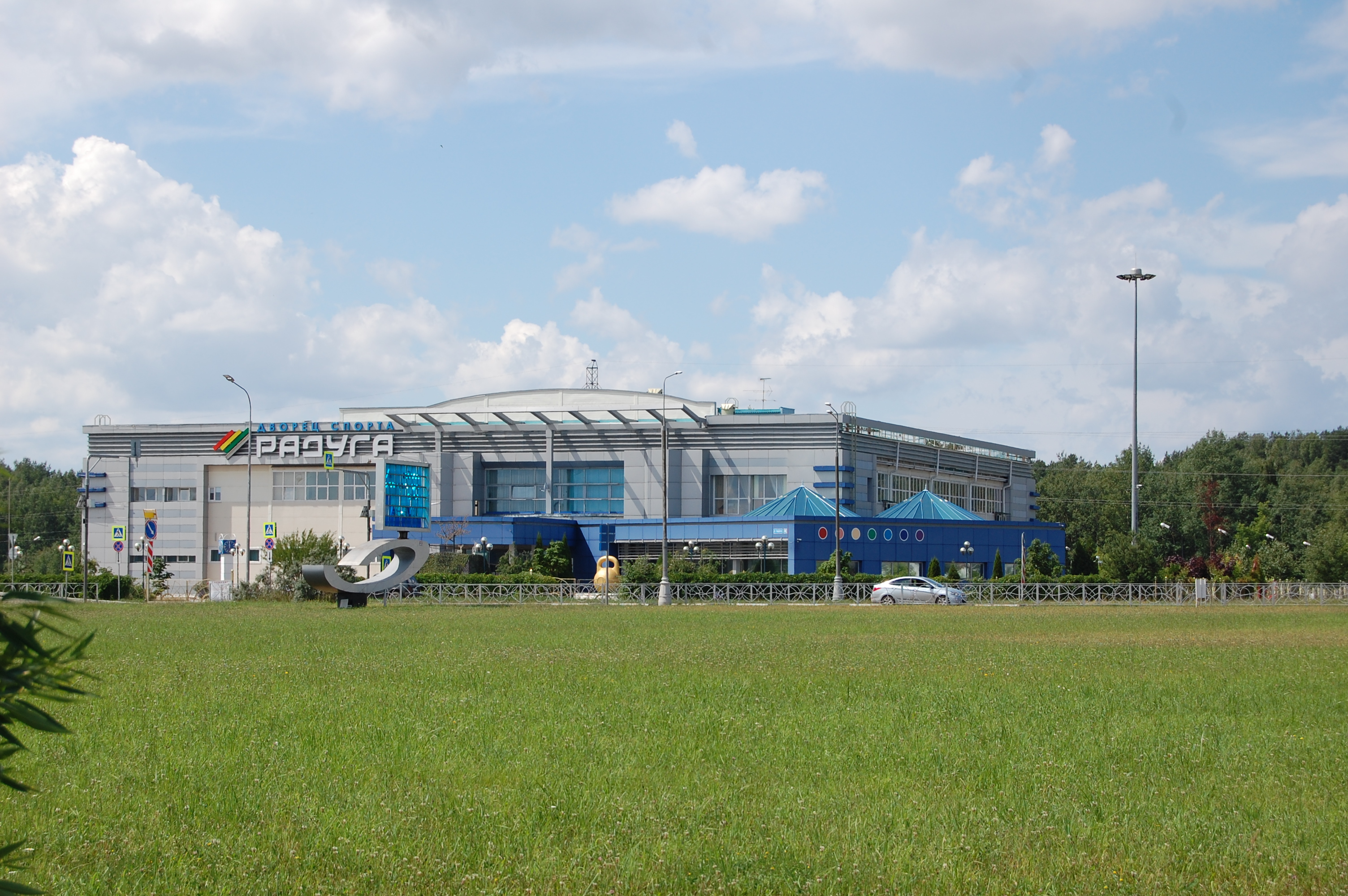
Raduga Pool

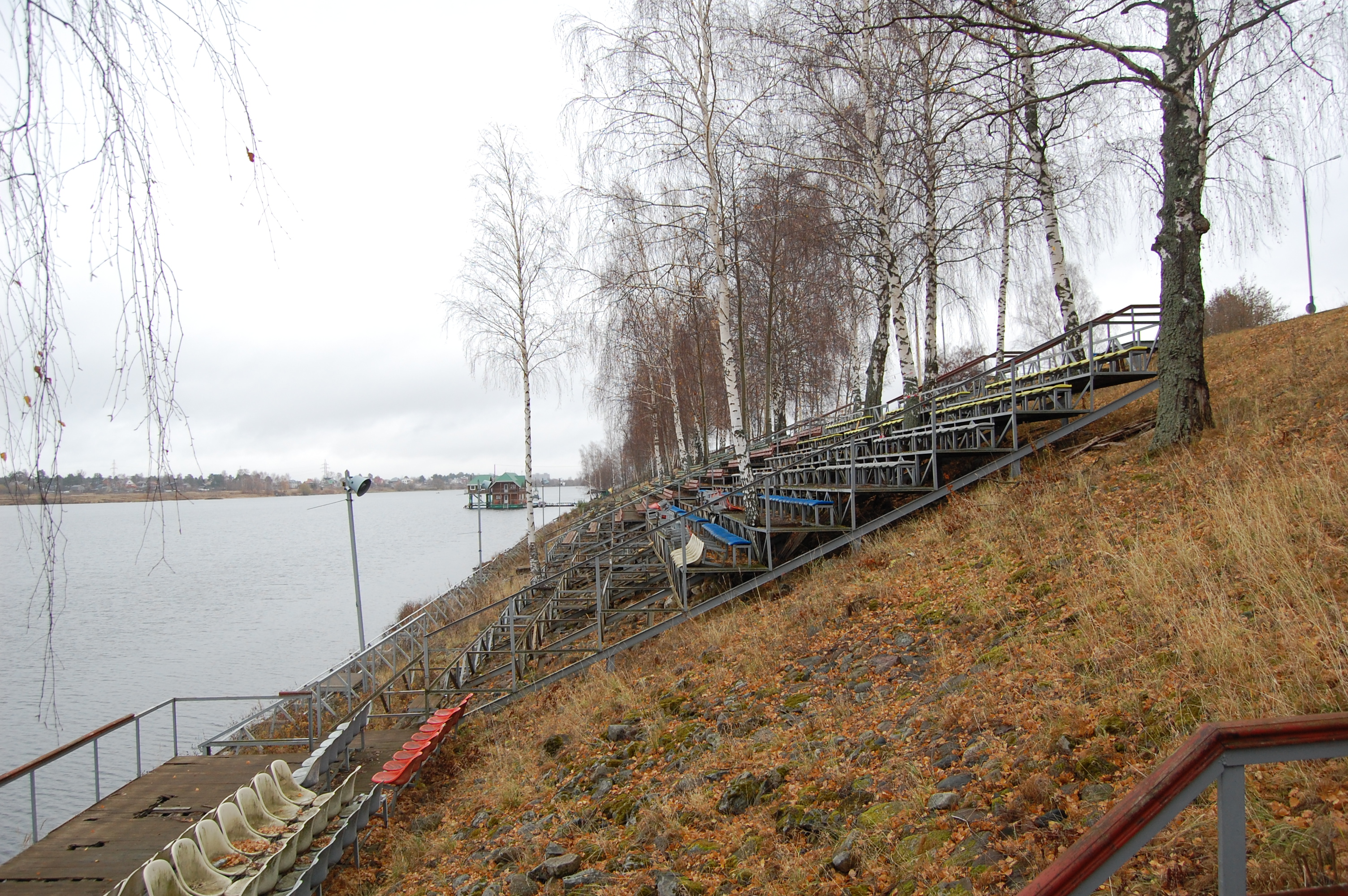
Nekhaevsky Brothers Water Stadium

Dubna is located on the Moscow Canal and the Ivankovo Reservoir, making it a good destination for water sports such as windsurfing, kitesurfing, and water skiing.. In 2004, for the first time, a stage of the Water Ski World Cup took place in the city. In 2011, Dubna hosted the World Waterskiing Championships. Dubna's sports facilities include two stadiums, a waterskiing stadium on the Volga River, four swimming pools, tennis courts, and five sports complexes.

== Twin towns and sister cities ==
Dubna is twinned with:

- Giv'at Shmuel, Israel
- La Crosse, Wisconsin, United States
- Alushta, Ukraine
- Kurchatov, Kazakhstan
- Lincang, China
- Nová Dubnica, Slovakia

== Gallery ==
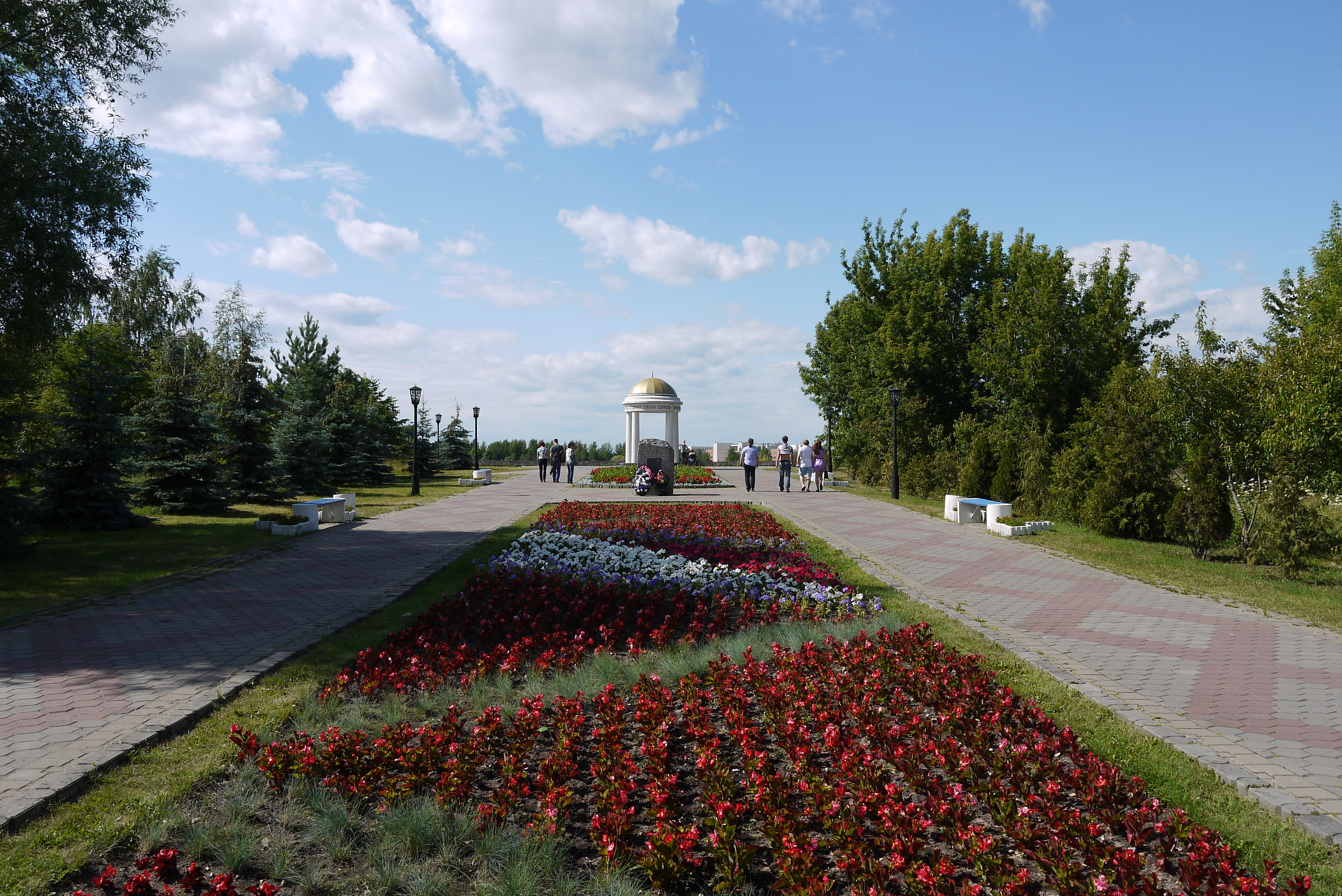
War Memorial and Gardens on the banks of the Volga River

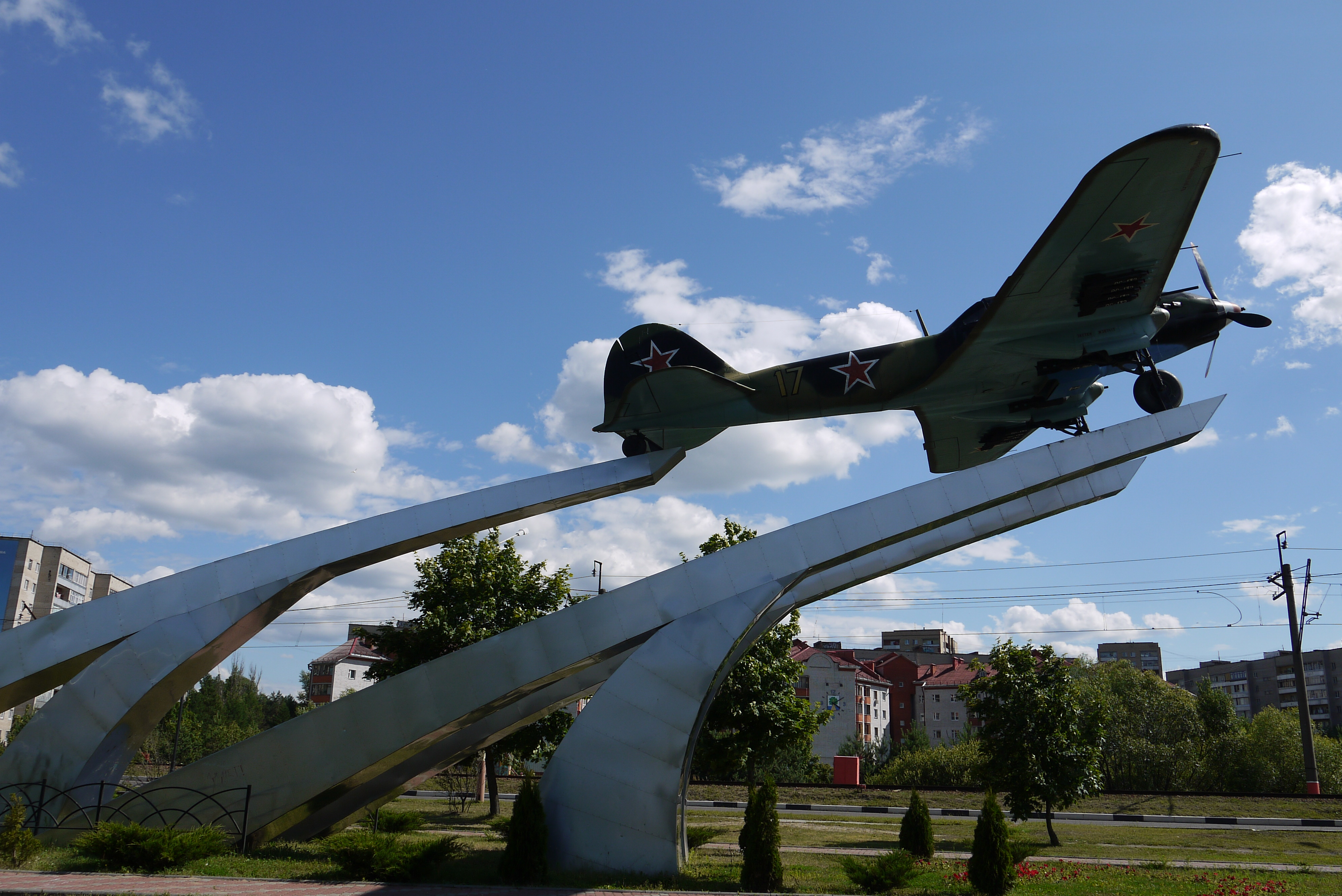
Ilyushin Il-2 in a war memorial in Dubna

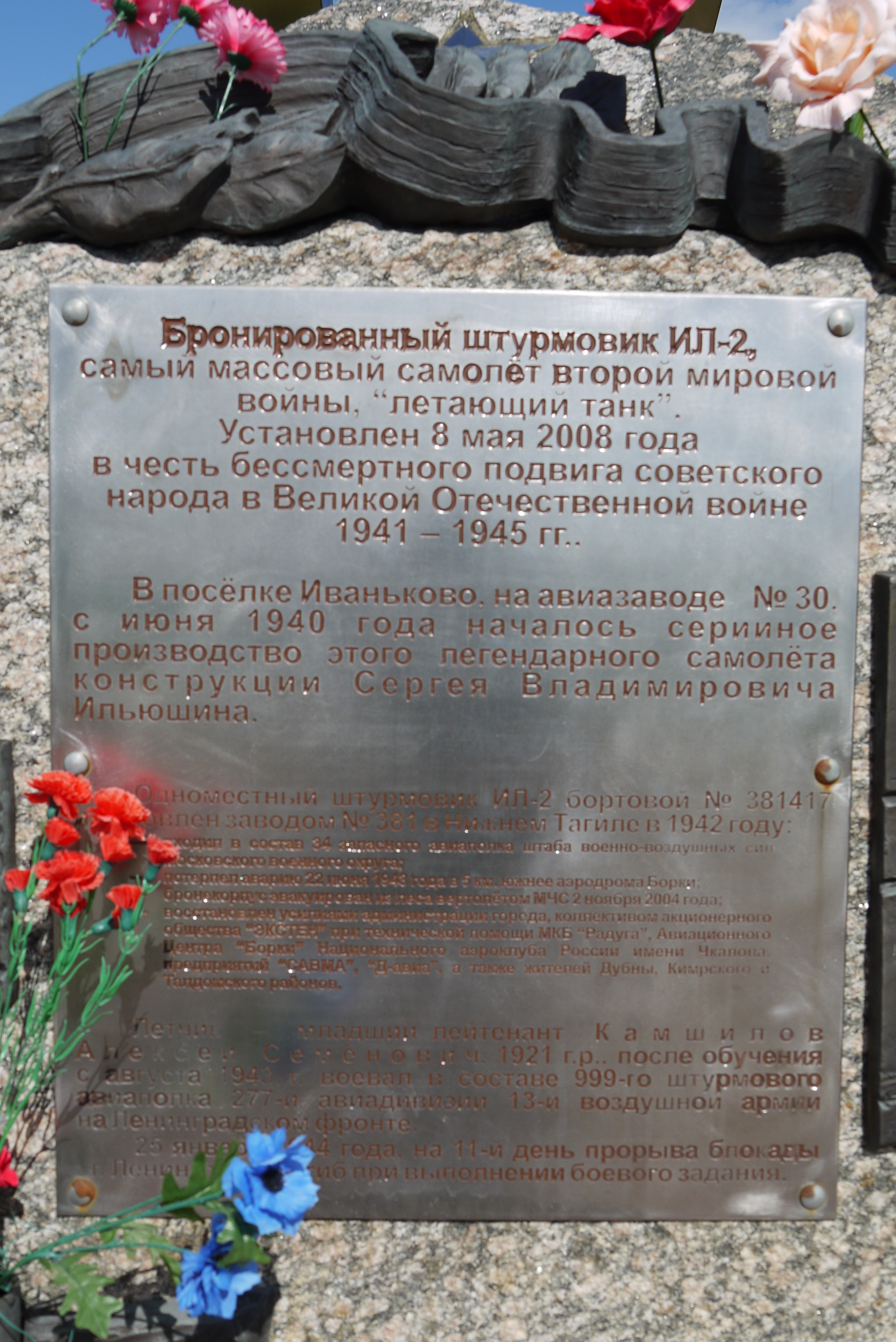
Plaque concerning the Ilyushin Il-2 war memorial in Dubna

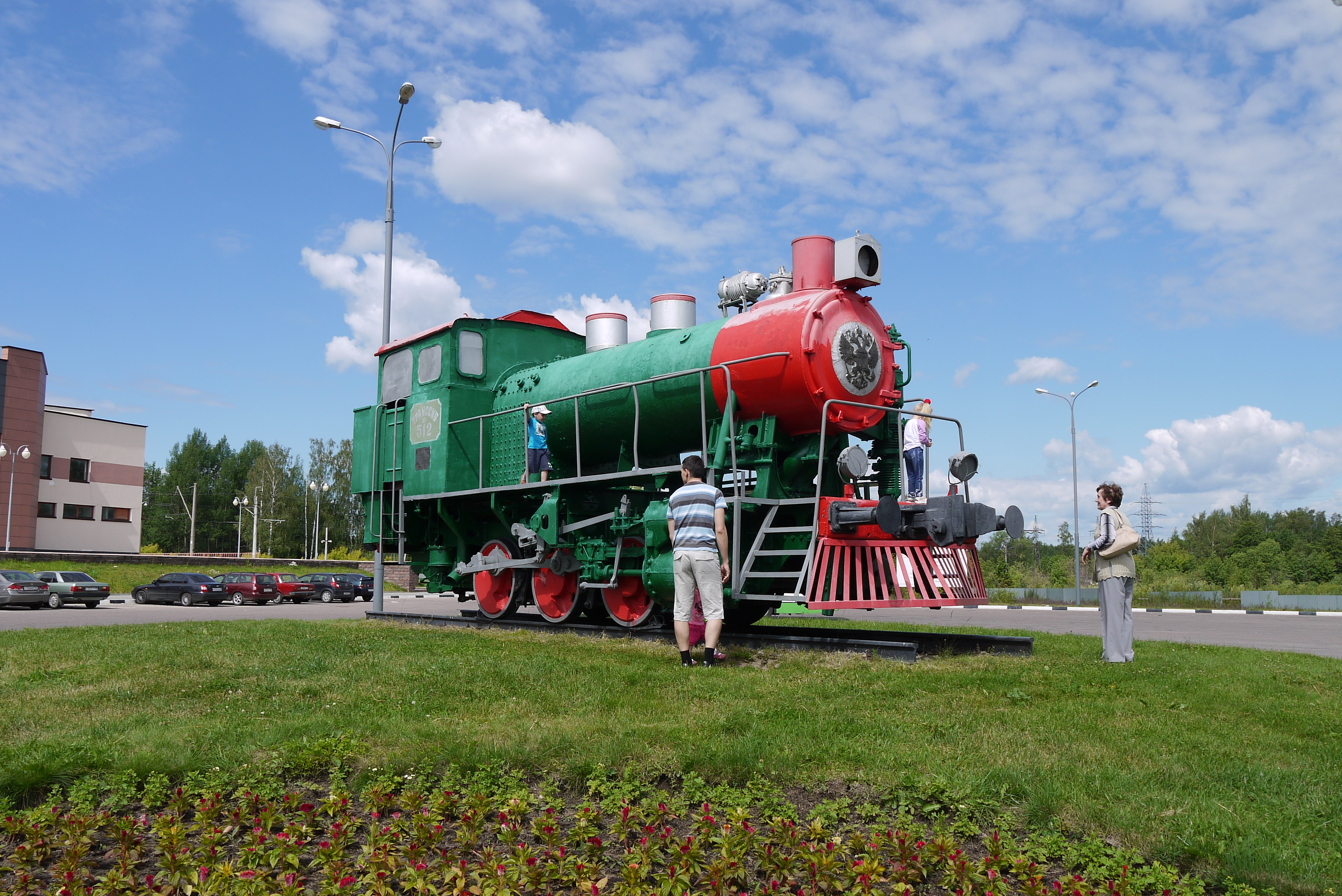
Russian locomotive class 9P number 9P512 outside the Bolshaya Volga railway station in Dubna

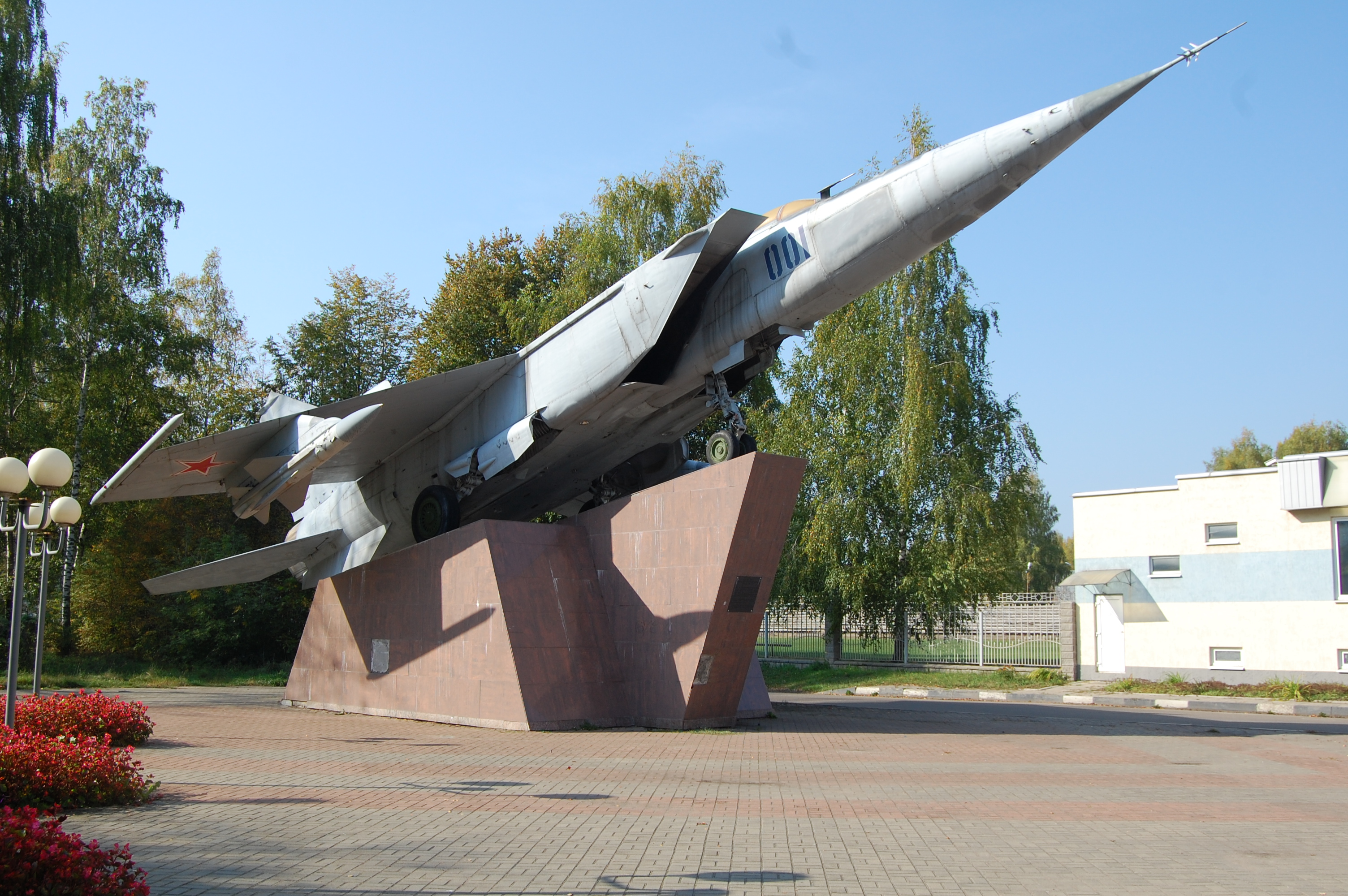
Monument to the Mikoyan-Gurevich MiG-25 in Dubna

== See also ==
- closed town
