= Bose–Einstein condensation of quasiparticles =

Occurrence in collective excitations

Bose–Einstein condensation can occur in quasiparticles, particles that are effective descriptions of collective excitations in materials. Some have integer spins and can be expected to obey Bose–Einstein statistics like traditional particles. Conditions for condensation of various quasiparticles have been predicted and observed. The topic continues to be an active field of study.

== Properties ==
BECs form when low temperatures cause nearly all particles to occupy the lowest quantum state. Condensation of quasiparticles occurs in ultracold gases and materials. The lower masses of material quasiparticles relative to atoms lead to higher BEC temperatures. An ideal Bose gas has a phase transitions when inter-particle spacing approaches the thermal De-Broglie wavelength: $k_B T =~ \hbar^2 n^{2/3}/M$.

The critical concentration is then $N \propto (T/2 \pi)^3 u^{1/2} P / v \hbar^3$, leading to a critical temperature: $T_c < 32\pi^3 \hbar^6 V^2u_0P^2$. The particles obey the Bose–Einstein distribution and all occupy the ground state:

The Bose gas can be considered in a harmonic trap, $V(r) = M \omega^2 /2$, with the ground state occupancy fraction as a function of temperature:

$$f(0)  = \frac{N_0(t)} N = 1 - \left( \frac T {T_c} \right)^3$$

This can be achieved by cooling and magnetic or optical control of the system. Spectroscopy can detect shifts in peaks indicating thermodynamic phases with condensation. Quasiparticle BEC can be superfluids. Signs of such states include spatial and temporal coherence and polarization changes. Observation for excitons in solids was seen in 2005 and for magnons in materials and polaritons in microcavities in 2006. Graphene is another important solid state system for studies of condensed matter including quasi particles; It's a 2D electron gas, similar to other thin films.

== Excitons ==
Excitons are electron-hole pairs. Similar to helium-4 superfluidity at the $\lambda$-point (2.17K); a condensate was proposed by Böer et al. in 1961. Experimental phenomenon were predicted leading to various pulsed laser searches that failed to produce evidence. Signs were first seen by Fuzukawa et al. in 1990, but definite detection was published later in the 2000s. Condensed excitons are a superfluid and will not interact with phonons. While the normal exciton absorption is broadened by phonons, in the superfluid absorption degenerates to a line.

=== Theory ===
Excitons results from photons exciting electrons creating holes, which are then attracted and can form bound states. The 1s paraexciton and orthoexciton are possible. The 1s triplet spin state, 12.1meV below the degenerate orthoexciton states(lifetime ~ns), is decoupled and has a long lifetime to an optical decay. Dilute gas densities (n~10^{14}cm^{−3}) are possible, but paraexciton generation scales poorly, so significant heating occurs in creating high densities(10^{17}cm^{−3}) preventing BECs. Assuming a thermodynamic phase occurs when separation reaches the de Broglie wavelength ($\lambda_{dB}$) gives:

$n^{1/3} = \hbar^{-1}(m_\text{eff} kT_{cr})^{1/2} \longrightarrow T_c = \frac{n^{2/3} \hbar^2}{k m_\text{eff}}$

Where, $n$ is the exciton density, effective mass (of electron mass order) $m_\text{eff}$, and $\hbar$,$k$ are the Planck and Boltzmann constants. Density depends on the optical generation $g$ and lifetime as: $n = g\tau$. Tuned lasers create excitons which efficiently self-annihilate at a rate: $dn/dt = -an^2$, preventing a high density paraexciton BEC. A potential well limits diffusion, damps exciton decay, and lowers the critical number, yielding an improved critical temperature versus the T^{3/2} scaling of free particles:

$$N_c = \zeta(3) \left( \frac{kT}{\hbar \omega} \right)^3$$

=== Experiments ===
In an ultrapure Cu_{2}O crystal: $\tau$ = 10s. For an achievable T = 0.01K, a manageable optical pumping rate of 10^{5}/s should produce a condensate. More detailed calculations by J. Keldysh and later by D. Snoke et al. started a large number of experimental searches into the 1990s that failed to detect signs. Pulse methods led to overheating, preventing condensate states. Helium cooling allows mili-kelvin setups and continuous wave optics improves on pulsed searches. Relaxation explosion of a condensate at lattice temperature 354 mK was seen by Yoshioka et al. in 2011. Recent experiments by Stolz et al. using a potential trap have given more evidence at ultralow temperature 37 mK. In a parabolic trap with exciton temperature 200 mK and lifetime broadened to 650ns, the dependence of luminescence on laser intensity has a kink which indicates condensation. The theory of a Bose gas is extended to a mean field interacting gas by a Bogoliubov approach to predict the exciton spectrum; The kink is considered a sign of transition to BEC. Signs were seen for a dense gas BEC in a GaAs quantum well.

== Magnons ==
Magnons, electron spin waves, can be controlled by a magnetic field. Densities from the limit of a dilute gas to a strongly interacting Bose liquid are possible. Magnetic ordering is the analog of superfluidity. The condensate appears as the emission of monochromatic microwaves, which are tunable with the applied magnetic field.

In 1999 condensation was demonstrated in antiferromagnetic TlCuCl_{3}, at temperatures as large as 14 K. The high transition temperature (relative to atomic gases) is due to the small mass (near an electron) and greater density. In 2006, condensation in a ferromagnetic Yttrium-iron-garnet thin film was seen even at room temperature with optical pumping. Condensation was reported in gadolinium in 2011. Magnon BECs have been considered as qubits for quantum computing.

== Polaritons ==
Polaritons, caused by light coupling to excitons, occur in optical cavities and condensation of exciton-polaritons in an optical microcavity was first published in Nature in 2006. Semiconductor cavity polariton gases transition to ground state occupation at 19K. Bogoliubov excitations were seen polariton BECs in 2008. The signatures of BEC were observed at room temperature for the first time in 2013, in a large exciton energy semiconductor device and in a polymer microcavity.

== Plasmonic quasiparticles ==
BECs of plasmonic excitations (surface lattice resonances, SLRs) and their dye-coupled quasiparticles (plasmon-exciton polaritons) have been realized in periodic arrays of metal nanoparticles overlaid with dye molecules. The first demonstration was achieved having the SLRs weakly coupled to dye molecules, facilitating thermalization by emission and re-absorption process. The key signatures of BEC were observed upon increasing the optical pump power up to a critical limit: non-linear increase of intensity as a function of the pump power, thermalized occupation of states following the Bose-Einstein distribution, and increased temporal and spatial coherence. Further increasing the molecule concentration led to the realization of BECs of strongly coupled exciton-polaritons, exhibiting ultrafast sub-picosecond thermalization dynamics and long-range correlations.

== Other quasiparticles ==
Rotons, an elementary excitation in superfluid ^{4}He introduced by Lev Landau, were discussed by Richard Feynman and others. Rotons condense at low temperature. Experiments have been proposed and the expected spectrum has been studied, but roton condensates have not been detected.

Phonons were first observed in a condensate in 2004 by ultrashort pulses in a bismuth crystal at 7K.

== See also ==
- Bose–Einstein condensate
- Bose-Einstein condensation of polaritons

== Important publications ==
- Ando, Tsuneya; Fowler, Alan B.; Stern, Frank (1 March 1982). "Electronic properties of two-dimensional systems". Reviews of Modern Physics. 54 (2). American Physical Society (APS): 437–672. Bibcode:1982RvMP...54..437A. doi:10.1103/revmodphys.54.437. ISSN 0034-6861.
- Dalfovo, Franco; Giorgini, Stefano; Pitaevskii, Lev P.; Stringari, Sandro (1 March 1999). "Theory of Bose-Einstein condensation in trapped gases". Reviews of Modern Physics. 71 (3). American Physical Society (APS): 463–512. arXiv:cond-mat/9806038. Bibcode:1999RvMP...71..463D. doi:10.1103/revmodphys.71.463. ISSN 0034-6861. S2CID 55787701.
- Bloch, Immanuel; Dalibard, Jean; Zwerger, Wilhelm (18 July 2008). "Many-body physics with ultracold gases". Reviews of Modern Physics. 80 (3): 885–964. arXiv:0704.3011. Bibcode:2008RvMP...80..885B. doi:10.1103/revmodphys.80.885. ISSN 0034-6861. S2CID 119618473.
- Bugrij, A. I.; Loktev, V. M. (2007). "On the theory of Bose–Einstein condensation of quasiparticles: On the possibility of condensation of ferromagnons at high temperatures". Low Temperature Physics. 33 (1). AIP Publishing: 37–50. Bibcode:2007LTP....33...37B. doi:10.1063/1.2409633. ISSN 1063-777X. S2CID 119340633.
- Butov, L. V.; Lai, C. W.; Ivanov, A. L.; Gossard, A. C.; Chemla, D. S. (2002). "Towards Bose–Einstein condensation of excitons in potential traps". Nature. 417 (6884). Springer Nature: 47–52. Bibcode:2002Natur.417...47B. doi:10.1038/417047a. ISSN 0028-0836. PMID 11986661. S2CID 4373555.
