= Vinod Menon =

Physicist

Vinod M. Menon
- Education: University of Hyderabad (M.Sc.); University of Massachusetts (Ph.D.)
- Known for: Exciton-polaritons and light-matter interactions in two-dimensional and quantum materials
- Awards: Fellow of the American Association for the Advancement of Science (2025); Fellow of the American Physical Society; Fellow of Optica
- Scientific career
- Fields: Physics, photonics, condensed matter physics
- Workplaces: City College of New York; Graduate Center, CUNY

Vinod M. Menon is a physicist who is a professor of physics at the City College of New York (CCNY) and the Graduate Center, CUNY, where he directs the Laboratory for Nano and Micro Photonics. He is known for experimental research on light-matter interactions in low-dimensional and quantum materials, in particular exciton-polaritons, hybrid light-matter quasiparticles formed by the strong coupling of light and matter.

== Education and career ==
Menon received a Master of Science in physics, with a specialization in quantum optics, from the University of Hyderabad in 1995, and a PhD in physics from the University of Massachusetts. He was a postdoctoral fellow at Princeton University before joining the City University of New York in 2005. At CCNY he leads the Laboratory for Nano and Micro Photonics and has served as chair of the physics department. He is also affiliated with the CUNY Advanced Science Research Center.

== Research ==
Menon's research is mostly on light-matter interaction at the nanoscale, including strong coupling of light with excitons in two-dimensional semiconductors, molecular polaritons, metamaterials, and cavity quantum electrodynamics, with applications toward quantum photonic and computing technologies. His team had previously studied light and magnetism in ultra-thin materials, creating single-layer LEDs and publishing the results in Nature.

== Awards and honors ==
In 2025 Menon was elected a Fellow of the American Association for the Advancement of Science. He is also a Fellow of the American Physical Society and a Fellow of Optica (formerly the Optical Society of America).
