= Coherent perfect absorber =

Device which absorbs coherent light waves; time-reversed laser

A coherent perfect absorber (CPA) or anti-laser is a device which absorbs coherent waves, such as coherent light waves, and converts them into some form of internal energy, e.g. heat or electrical energy. It is the time-reversed counterpart of a laser. Coherent perfect absorption allows control of waves with waves (light with light) without a nonlinear medium.

The concept was first published in the July 26, 2010, issue of Physical Review Letters, by a team at Yale University led by theorist A. Douglas Stone and experimental physicist Hui W. Cao. In the September 9, 2010, issue of Physical Review A, Stefano Longhi of Polytechnic University of Milan showed how to combine a laser and an anti-laser in a single device. In February 2011 the team at Yale built the first working anti-laser. It is a two-channel CPA device which absorbs two beams from the same laser, but only when the beams have the correct phases and amplitudes. The initial device absorbed 99.4 percent of all incoming light, but the team behind the invention believe it will be possible to achieve 99.999 percent. Originally implemented as a Fabry-Pérot cavity that is many wavelengths thick, the optical CPA operates at specific optical frequencies. In January 2012, thin-film CPA has been proposed by utilizing the achromatic dispersion of metal-like materials, exhibiting the unparalleled bandwidth and thin profile advantages. Shortly after, CPA was observed in various thin film materials, including photonic metamaterial, multi-layer graphene, single and multiple layers of chromium, as well as microwave metamaterial.

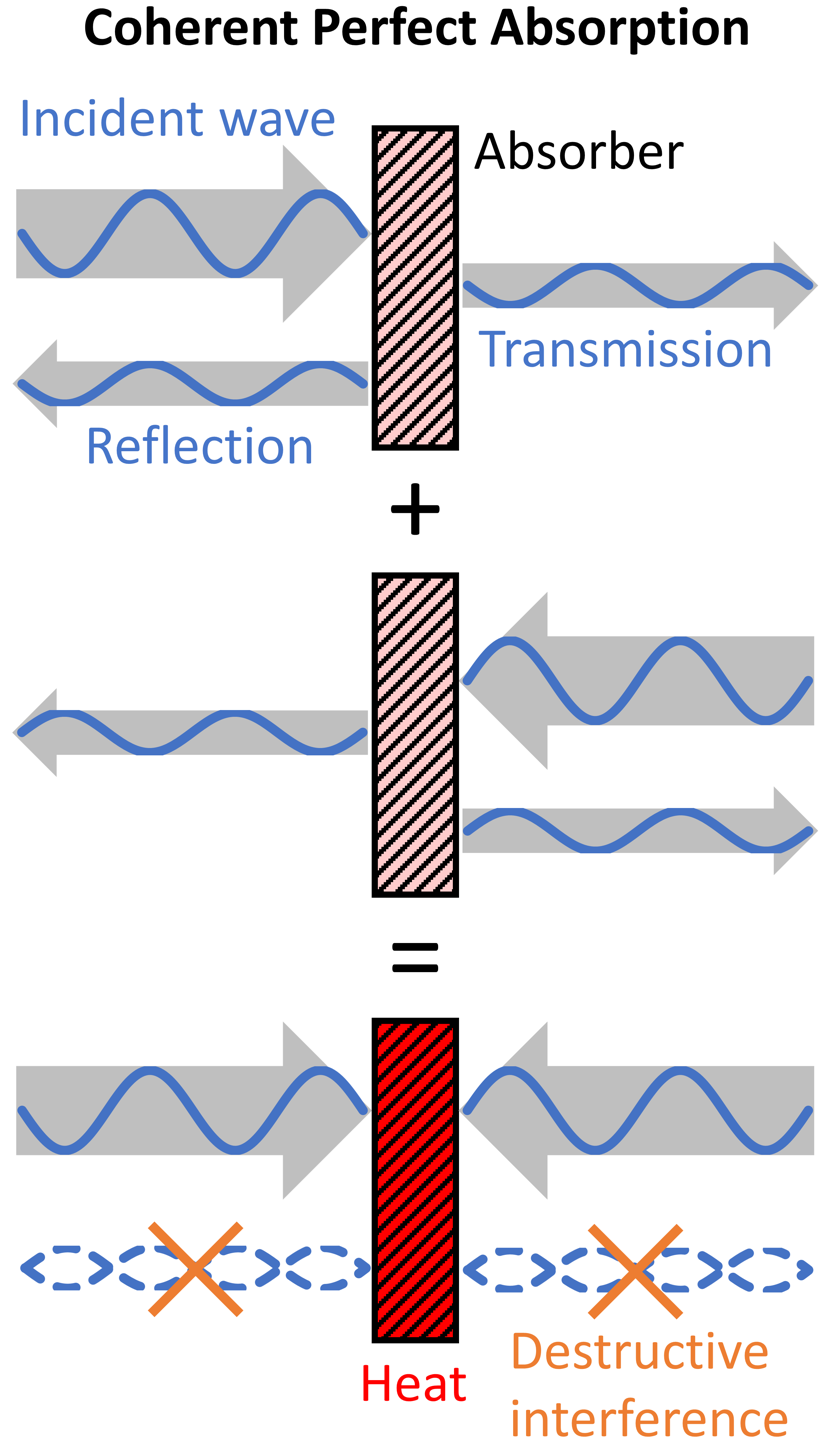
Coherent perfect absorption arises from destructive interference of transmitted and reflected waves, which traps wave energy within an absorber until it is absorbed.

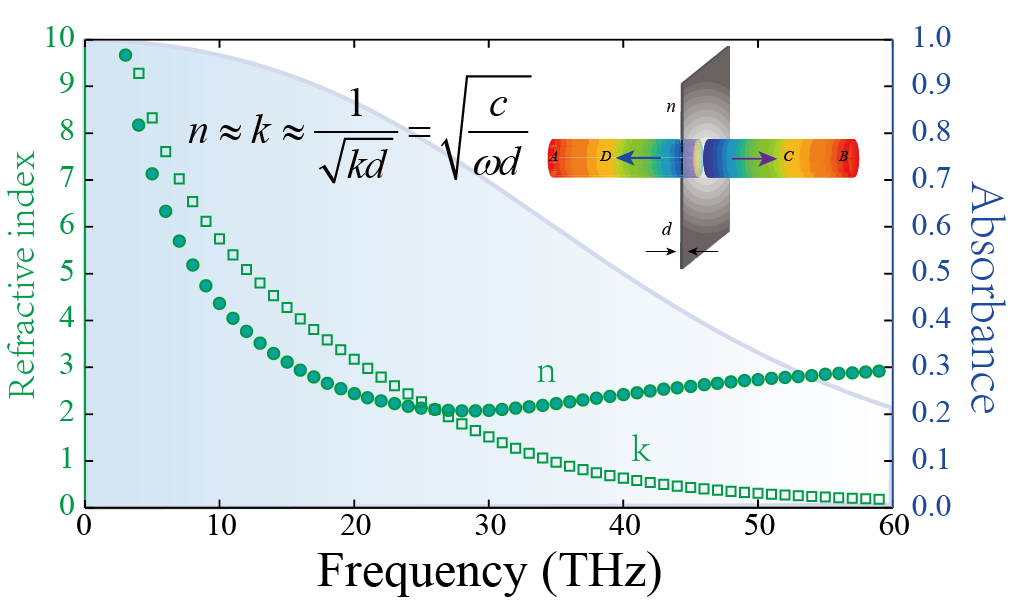
Real (n) and imaginary (k) parts of the refractive index of strongly-doped silicon and the corresponding coherent absorption for a film thickness of 150 nm.

== Anti-laser principle and demonstration ==
In the initial design, identical laser beams are fired onto opposite sides of a cavity consisting of a silicon wafer, a light-absorbing material that acts as a "loss medium". While light incident on one side would be partially transmitted and reflected, simultaneous illumination of both sides can result in destructive interference of all transmitted and reflected waves. Such complete suppression of transmission and reflection traps the optical energy within the loss medium until it is fully absorbed. The photons bounce back and forth until they are absorbed and transformed into heat. In contrast, a normal laser uses a gain medium which amplifies light instead of absorbing it.

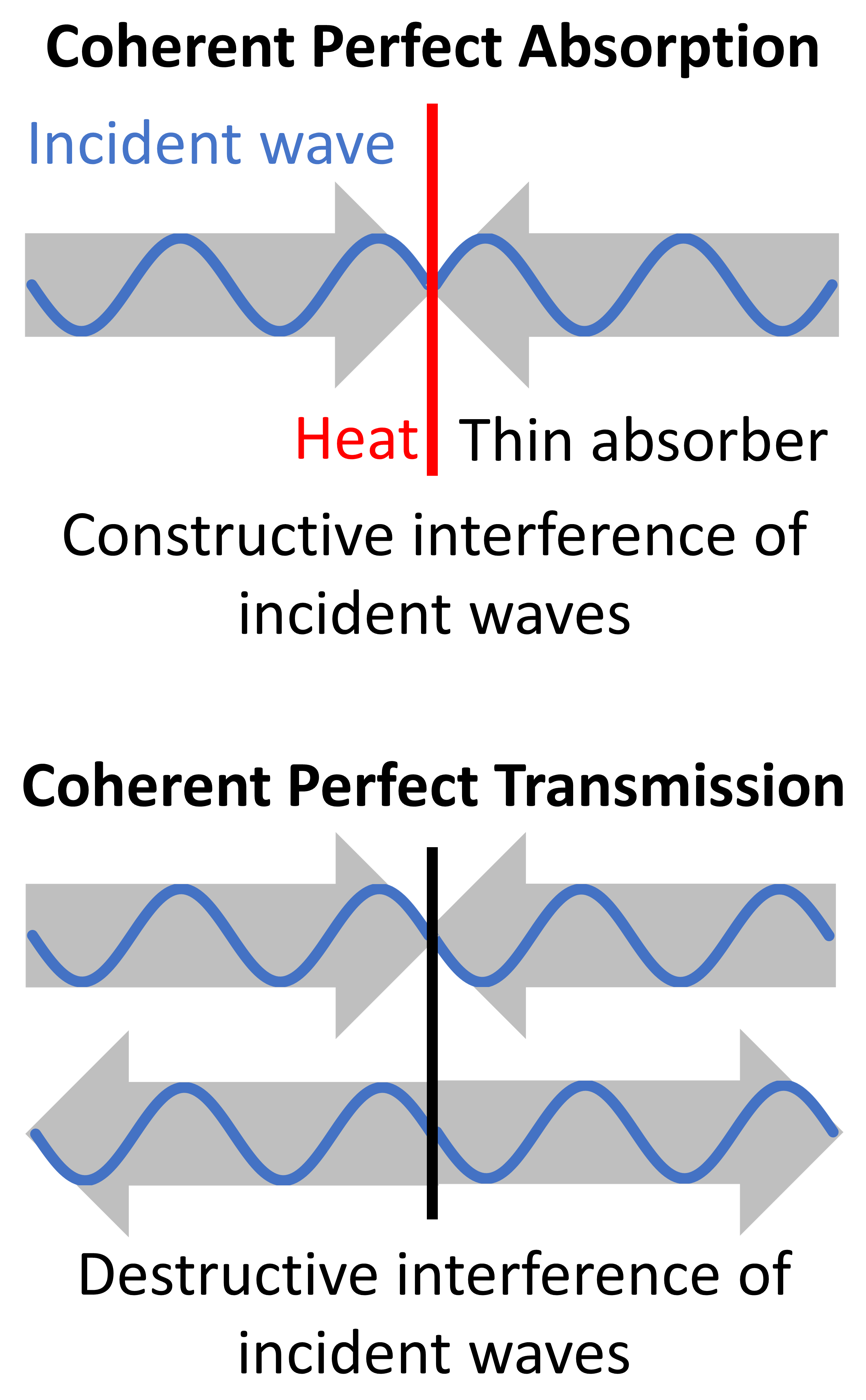
Constructive interference of mutually coherent counterpropagating waves on a thin material enhances the wave-matter interaction, while destructive interference suppresses it.

== Coherent perfect absorption and transmission in thin films ==
If the absorbing medium is thin in comparison to the wavelength, then constructive interference of mutually coherent waves incident on opposite sides of the absorber will enhance the level of absorption, while destructive interference will suppress it. For an ideal coherent absorber thin film, absorption can be enhanced to 100% and suppressed down to 0%, where absorption can be tuned between these extremes by adjusting the phase difference between the incident waves. Necessary conditions for coherent perfect absorption include that the film, when illuminated from one side only, will act as a (lossy) beam splitter, transmitting and reflecting equal fractions of the incident power. Necessary conditions for coherent perfect transmission include that, for illumination from one side, 25% of the incident power is transmitted and reflected each.

Coherent perfect absorption in thin films is ultrafast, absorption of ~10 femtosecond light pulses has been demonstrated, implying that it can offer around 100 THz bandwidth. The demonstration of CPA of single photons indicates that the effect is compatible with arbitrarily low intensities and has led to opportunities for quantum technologies.

While absorption of electromagnetic waves is usually considered, the concept is also applicable to other waves (such as sound waves) and other phenomena. Indeed, as constructive and destructive interference of waves on a thin material enhance and suppress the wave-matter interaction, any effect of the medium on the wave may be controlled in this way, including polarization effects associated with chirality and anisotropy, as well as refraction and nonlinear optical phenomena.

== Applications ==
Coherent perfect absorbers can be used to build absorptive interferometers, which could be useful in detectors, transducers, and optical switches. Another potential application is in radiology, where the principle of the CPA might be used to precisely target electromagnetic radiation inside human tissues for therapeutic or imaging purposes.

Integration of thin coherent perfect absorbers in waveguides has led to proof-of-principle demonstrations of fast and low-energy all-optical signal processing and cryptography, while integration of CPA with imaging systems has enabled demonstrations of all-optical focusing, pattern recognition & image processing, and massively parallel all-optical signal processing. In principle, such applications can offer extremely high bandwidth and low energy consumption.
