= Charles Santori =

American physicist

Charles Santori is an American physicist. He obtained his Bachelor of Science degree from MIT in 1997 and then got his Ph.D. in applied physics from Stanford University six years later after finishing his studies on semiconductors with Professor Yoshihisa Yamamoto. In 2005 Charles joined HP Labs where he researches diamond photonics. A year before his graduation from Stanford he along with other classmates of Yamamoto team invented quantum cryptography that used photon turnstile device. The same year, he published one of his most cited works on indistinguishable photons called Indistinguishable photons from a single-photon device.
