= Hui Cao =

Chinese American physicist

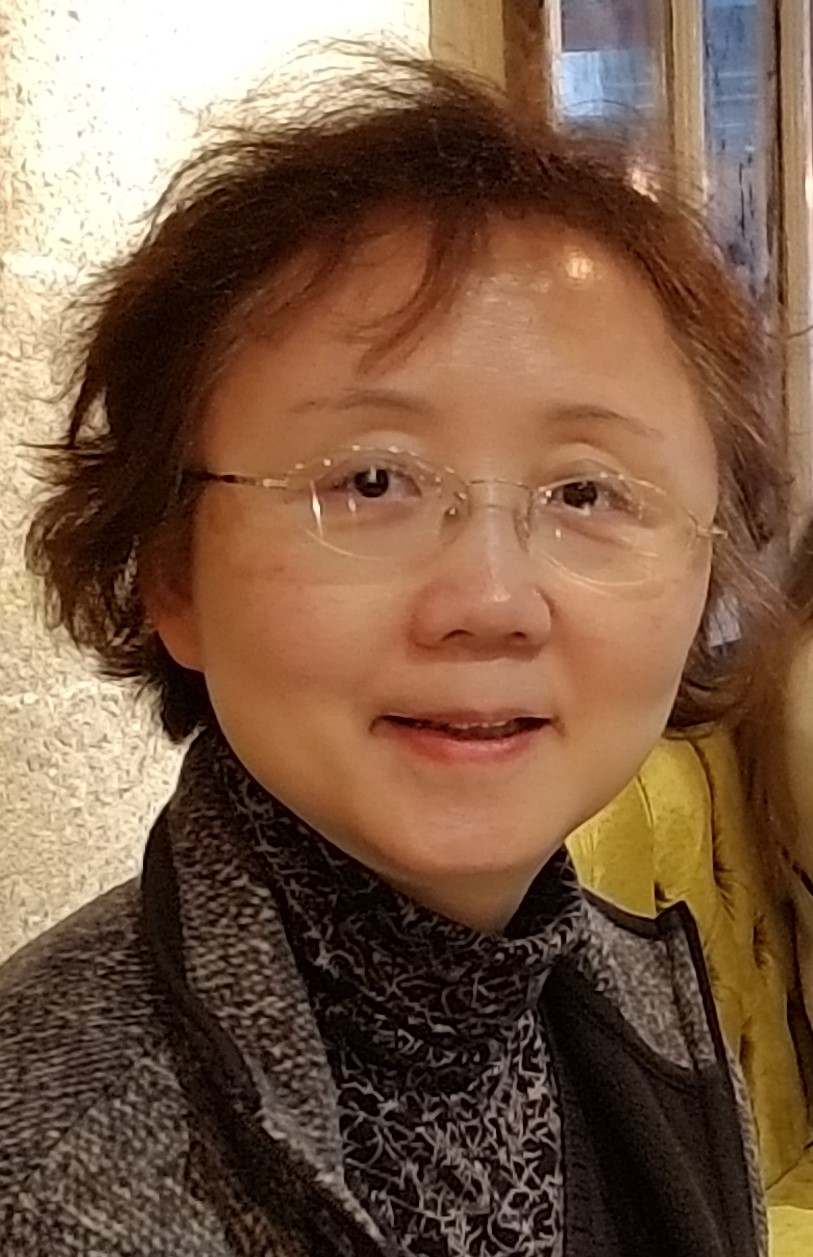
- Born: June 16, 1968 (age 58)
- Education: Peking University; Princeton University; Stanford University
- Scientific career
- Workplaces: Yale University; Northwestern University
- Thesis: Semiconductor Cavity Quantum Electrodynamics (1998)
- Doctoral advisor: Yoshihisa Yamamoto
- Website: https://www.eng.yale.edu/caolab/

Hui Cao (Chinese: 曹蕙; born June 16, 1968) is a Chinese-American physicist and engineer who is the professor of applied physics, a professor of physics and a professor of electrical engineering at Yale University. Her research interests are mesoscopic physics, complex photonic materials and devices, with a focus on non-conventional lasers and their unique applications. As the John C. Malone Professor of Applied Physics and Physics at Yale University, her work bridges nanophotonics with mesoscopic physics, nonlinear dynamics, and biophotonics. She is an elected member of the National Academy of Sciences and of the American Academy of Arts and Sciences.

== Early life and education ==
Cao became interested in physics as a young child, when her father, a professor of physics at Peking University, asked her what travels furthest and fastest. When she learned that the answer was light, she became fascinated by the discipline of optics. Cao earned her undergraduate degree in physics at Peking University in Beijing, China. She moved to the United States for her graduate studies, where she joined Princeton University as a graduate student in mechanical & aerospace engineering. She enjoyed the focus of the United States' training on independent, inquisitive thinking. After completing her master's degree, Cao joined Stanford University as a PhD student in applied physics. At Stanford she worked on semiconductor cavity quantum electrodynamics with Yamamoto Yoshihisa. Her doctoral research was published as a monograph by Springer Publishing. She and co-workers proposed a novel exciton-polariton light-emitting diode.

== Research and career ==
After receiving her PhD degree from Stanford University in 1997, Cao joined the physics faculty at Northwestern University. Whilst she was still interested in quantum electrodynamics, she started to explore new research area and launched a collaboration with Robert P. H. Chang studying the optical properties of zinc oxide. At the time, people were interested in creating ultraviolet lasers out of zinc oxide, but struggled to make a laser cavity with zinc oxide which is difficult to cleave or etch. Whilst measuring the fluorescence of polycrystalline zinc oxide films, Cao observed lasing; an unexpected result given the absence of any cavity. She later attributed this lasing to the random scattering of light from the zinc oxide grains. Cao switched her research focus to random lasers – the lasers with feedback provided by multiple scattering events. Cao also employed the interference of multiply scattered light as a novel mechanism for three-dimensional optical confinement and fabricated microlasers with ZnO nanoparticles. Since 2008, Cao served as the American Physical Society Division of Laser Science Distinguished Traveling Lecturers. Her other area of interest is the coherent control of light transport in diffusive medium and multimode fibers, with potential applications in endoscopy and deep tissue imaging.

In 2008 Cao joined Yale University as a professor of applied physics and a professor of physics. In collaboration with Michael A. Choma at Yale medical school, she applied her understanding of random lasing systems to the design of novel illumination sources for speckle-free imaging. At Yale, Cao started the biophotonics program and studied the structural color in nature. In conventional lasers, high spatial coherence can result in artefacts such as speckle noise, which can compromise full-field imaging. While having similar brightnesses to conventional lasers, random lasers can have low spatial coherence like light emitting diodes (LEDs) and avoid speckle noise in full-field imaging and parallel projection. Random lasers are simple to fabricate, as they are made of disordered materials. Cao also developed the light sources for optical coherence tomography for biomedical applications. She designed a novel laser system that can switch between high and low spatial coherence, allowing for both speckle-free imaging (to monitor the structure of an object) and speckle-full imaging (to track the motion of an object). She applied such a laser to imaging the heartbeat of a living tadpole, which is an animal model of human heart disease.

In addition, Cao studied other types of non-conventional lasers, including chaotic microcavity lasers, deterministic aperiodic lasers, photonic amorphous lasers, and topological defect lasers. She worked with A. Douglas Stone on a new mathematical theory to model such laser systems. Cao and Stone were the first researchers to create an anti-laser; a device in which incoming beams of light interfere with one another and cancel the outgoing waves. Cao dubbed these devices coherent perfect absorbers (CPAs), and proposed that they can be used as optical switches and radiology. She also showed that it is possible to control light transmission and absorption in opaque media by shaping the spatial wavefronts of laser beams.

After moving to Yale, Cao started the biophotonics program and established collaborations with several biologists and material scientists. In collaboration with Richard Prum and Eric Dufresne, she figured out how the vivid color of bird feather is produced by nanostructures instead of pigments. Together with Antonia Monterio, Cao studied the evolution of the structural color and how it is affected by the environment. She was able to control lasing in biomimetic structures with short-range order.

In 2012 Cao demonstrated that a multimode fiber can function as an ultra-high-resolution broadband spectrometer. The speckle pattern, generated by interference among the guided modes in a fiber, is unique for each wavelength and can be used as a fingerprint to identify the spectral content of the input light. In 2013, Cao realised a high-resolution microspectrometer on a disordered photonic chip. She fabricated a random array of air holes in a silicon wafer. Multiple-scattering events within the random structure allows for tiny, high resolution spectrometers that can be used for a variety of applications.

Alongside the novel photonic devices, Cao made use of non-conventional lasers for high power, stable lasing systems. In collaboration with Ortwin Hess at Imperial College London and Qijie Wang at Nanyang Technological University, she utilized wave-chaotic cavities as well as disordered cavities to disrupt the formation of filaments. Filaments can lead to instabilities during laser operation, and Cao has shown that introducing wave chaos to a laser resonator can significantly improve the emission stability.

In 2018 Cao was named the Yale University Beinecke Professor of Applied Physics, and in 2019 the John C. Malone Professor of Applied Physics and of Physics. She has been a member of the International Scientific Committee of ESPCI Paris since 2017, and a member of the advisory board of the Max Planck Institute for the Science of Light.

Her research led to several breakthroughs, including speckle-free imaging using random lasers for biomedical applications; compact, high-resolution spectrometers based on disordered photonic chips; coherent control of light in multimode fibers for deep-tissue imaging and endoscopy; and ultrafast random-number generation using chip-scale lasers.

== Awards and honors ==
- 1999 David and Lucille Packard Fellowship for Science and Engineering
- 2000 Sloan Research Fellowship
- 2001 National Science Foundation CAREER Award
- 2004 Alexander von Humboldt Foundation Friedrich Wilhelm Bessel Research Award
- 2006 American Physical Society Maria Goeppert-Mayer Award
- 2007 Elected Fellow of the American Physical Society
- 2007 Elected Fellow of The Optical Society of America
- 2013 John Simon Guggenheim Fellowship
- 2014 Microscopy Today Innovation Award
- 2015 Willis E. Lamb Award for Laser Science
- 2017 Elected Fellow of American Association for the Advancement of Science
- 2019 Elected Fellow of the Institute of Electrical and Electronics Engineers
- 2021 Elected to the National Academy of Sciences
- 2021 Elected to the American Academy of Arts and Sciences
- 2021 IEEE Photonics Society (IPS) Aron Kressel Award
- 2022 Rolf Landauer Medal, the International ETOPIM Association

== Select publications ==
- Cao, H.; Zhao, Y. G.; Ho, S. T.; Seelig, E. W.; Wang, Q. H.; Chang, R. P. H. (1999-03-15). "Random Laser Action in Semiconductor Powder". Physical Review Letters. 82 (11): 2278–2281. Bibcode:1999PhRvL..82.2278C. doi:10.1103/PhysRevLett.82.2278.
- Cao, H.; Xu, J. Y.; Zhang, D. Z.; Chang, S.-H.; Ho, S. T.; Seelig, E. W.; Liu, X.; Chang, R. P. H. (2000-06-12). "Spatial Confinement of Laser Light in Active Random Media". Physical Review Letters. 84 (24): 5584–5587. Bibcode:2000PhRvL..84.5584C. doi:10.1103/PhysRevLett.84.5584. PMID 10991000.
- Cao, H.; Zhao, Y. G.; Ong, H. C.; Ho, S. T.; Dai, J. Y.; Wu, J. Y.; Chang, R. P. H. (1998-12-21). "Ultraviolet lasing in resonators formed by scattering in semiconductor polycrystalline films". Applied Physics Letters. 73 (25): 3656–3658. Bibcode:1998ApPhL..73.3656C. doi:10.1063/1.122853. ISSN 0003-6951.
