= Course of Theoretical Physics =

Theoretical physics textbook series by Lev Landau and Evgeny Lifshitz

- Cover of the first volume, Mechanics (Russian Edition)
- Author: Lev Landau (Vol. 1–3, 5–8); Evgeny Lifshitz (Vol. 1–10); Vladimir Berestetskii (Vol. 4); Lev Pitaevskii (Vol. 4, 9–10)
- Language: Russian, German, English, French, Spanish, Italian, Polish, Hungarian, Chinese, Japanese
- Subject: Physics
- Genre: Textbook
- Publisher: Russian: Fizmatgiz, Fizmatlit, Nauka; English: Addison-Wesley, Butterworth-Heinemann, Pergamon Press; German: Akademie Verlag, Verlag Harri Deutsch, Europa-Lehrmittel; French: Éditions Mir; Chinese: Higher Education Press
- Publication place: Soviet Union

The Course of Theoretical Physics is a ten-volume series of books covering theoretical physics that was initiated by Lev Landau and written in collaboration with his student Evgeny Lifshitz starting in the late 1930s.

It is said that Landau composed much of the series in his head while in an NKVD prison in 1938–1939. However, almost all of the actual writing of the early volumes was done by Lifshitz, giving rise to the witticism, "not a word of Landau and not a thought of Lifshitz". The first eight volumes were finished in the 1950s, written in Russian and translated into English in the late 1950s by John Stewart Bell, together with John Bradbury Sykes, M. J. Kearsley, and W. H. Reid. The last two volumes were written in the early 1980s. Vladimir Berestetskii and Lev Pitaevskii also contributed to the series. The series is often referred to as "Landau and Lifshitz", "Landafshitz" (Russian: "Ландафшиц"), or "Lanlifshitz" (Russian: "Ланлифшиц") in informal settings.

== Impact ==
The presentation of material is advanced and typically considered suitable for graduate-level study. Despite this specialized character, it is estimated that a million volumes of the Course were sold by 2005.

The series has been called "renowned" in Science and "celebrated" in American Scientist. A note in Mathematical Reviews states, "The usefulness and the success of this course have been proved by the great number of successive editions in Russian, English, French, German and other languages." At a centenary celebration of Landau's career, it was observed that the Course had shown "unprecedented longevity."

In 1962, Landau and Lifshitz were awarded the Lenin Prize for their work on the Course. This was the first occasion on which the Lenin Prize had been awarded for the teaching of physics.

== English editions ==
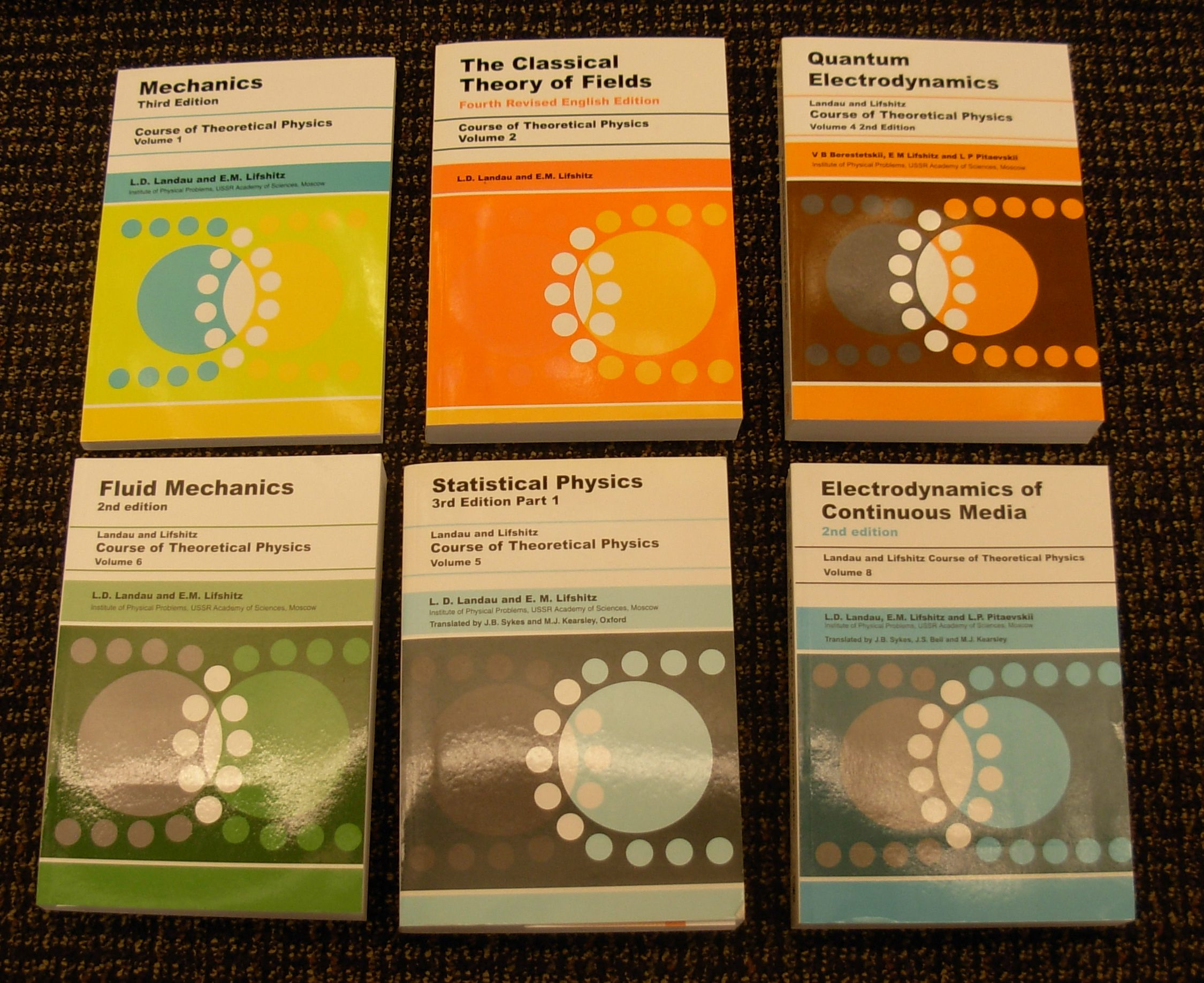
Course of Theoretical Physics

The following list does not include reprints and revised editions.

=== Volume 1 ===
- Landau, Lev D.; Lifshitz, Evgeny M. (1960). Mechanics. Vol. 1 (1st ed.). Pergamon Press. ASIN B0006AWV88.
  - Landau, Lev D.; Lifshitz, Evgeny M. (1969). Mechanics. Vol. 1 (2nd ed.). Pergamon Press. ISBN 978-0-201-04146-0.
  - Landau, Lev D.; Lifshitz, Evgeny M. (1976). Mechanics. Vol. 1 (3rd ed.). Butterworth-Heinemann. ISBN 978-0-7506-2896-9.

Volume 1 covers classical mechanics without special or general relativity, in the Lagrangian and Hamiltonian formalisms.

=== Volume 2 ===
- Landau, Lev D.; Lifshitz, Evgeny M. (1951). The Classical Theory of Fields. Vol. 2 (1st ed.). Addison-Wesley. ASIN B0007G5B42.
  - Landau, Lev D.; Lifshitz, Evgeny M. (1959). The Classical Theory of Fields. Vol. 2 (2nd ed.). Pergamon Press.
  - Landau, Lev D.; Lifshitz, Evgeny M. (1971). The Classical Theory of Fields. Vol. 2 (3rd ed.). Pergamon Press. ISBN 978-0-08-016019-1.
  - Landau, Lev D.; Lifshitz, Evgeny M. (1975). The Classical Theory of Fields. Vol. 2 (4th ed.). Butterworth-Heinemann. ISBN 978-0-7506-2768-9.

Volume 2 covers relativistic mechanics of particles, and classical field theory for fields, specifically special relativity and electromagnetism, general relativity and gravitation.

=== Volume 3 ===
- Landau, Lev D.; Lifshitz, Evgeny M. (1958). Quantum Mechanics: Non-Relativistic Theory. Vol. 3 (1st ed.). Pergamon Press.
  - Landau, Lev D.; Lifshitz, Evgeny M. (1965). Quantum Mechanics: Non-Relativistic Theory. Vol. 3 (2nd ed.). Pergamon Press.
  - Landau, Lev D.; Lifshitz, Evgeny M. (1977). Quantum Mechanics: Non-Relativistic Theory. Vol. 3 (3rd ed.). Pergamon Press. ISBN 978-0-08-020940-1.

Volume 3 covers quantum mechanics without special relativity.

=== Volume 4 ===
- Berestetskii, Vladimir B.; Lifshitz, Evgeny M.; Pitaevskii, Lev P. (1971). Relativistic Quantum Theory. Vol. 4 (1st ed.). Pergamon Press. ISBN 978-0-08-017175-3.
  - Berestetskii, Vladimir B.; Lifshitz, Evgeny M.; Pitaevskii, Lev P. (1982). Quantum Electrodynamics. Vol. 4 (2nd ed.). Butterworth-Heinemann. ISBN 978-0-7506-3371-0.

The original edition comprised two books, labelled part 1 and part 2. The first covered general aspects of relativistic quantum mechanics and relativistic quantum field theory, leading onto quantum electrodynamics. The second continued with quantum electrodynamics and what was then known about the strong and weak interactions. These books were published in the early 1970s, at a time when the strong and weak forces were still not well understood. In the second edition, the corresponding sections were scrapped and replaced with more topics in the well-established quantum electrodynamics, and the two parts were unified into one, thus providing a one-volume exposition on relativistic quantum field theory with the electromagnetic interaction as the prototype of a quantum field theory.

=== Volume 5 ===
- Statistical Physics. Vol. 5 (1st ed.). 1951.
  - Early version: Landau, Lev D. (1938). Statistical Physics. Clarendon Press. ASIN B00085BKZG.
  - Statistical Physics. Vol. 5 (2nd ed.). 1968.
  - Landau, Lev D.; Lifshitz, Evgeny M. (1980). Statistical Physics. Vol. 5 (3rd ed.). Butterworth-Heinemann. ISBN 978-0-7506-3372-7.

Volume 5 covers general statistical mechanics and thermodynamics and applications, including chemical reactions, phase transitions, and condensed matter physics.

=== Volume 6 ===
- Landau, Lev D.; Lifshitz, Evgeny M. (1959). Fluid Mechanics. Vol. 6 (1st ed.). Pergamon Press. ISBN 978-0-08-009104-4.
- Landau, Lev D.; Lifshitz, Evgeny M. (1987). Fluid Mechanics. Vol. 6 (2nd ed.). Butterworth-Heinemann. ISBN 978-0-08-033933-7.

Volume 6 covers fluid mechanics in a condensed but varied exposition, from ideal to viscous fluids, includes a chapter on relativistic fluid mechanics, and another on superfluids.

=== Volume 7 ===
- Landau, Lev D.; Lifshitz, Evgeny M. (1959). Theory of Elasticity. Vol. 7 (1st ed.). Pergamon Press.
- Landau, Lev D.; Lifshitz, Evgeny M. (1970). Theory of Elasticity. Vol. 7 (2nd ed.). Pergamon Press. ISBN 978-0-08-006465-9.
- Landau, Lev D.; Lifshitz, Evgeny M. (1986). Theory of Elasticity. Vol. 7 (3rd ed.). Butterworth-Heinemann. ISBN 978-0-7506-2633-0.

Volume 7 covers elasticity theory of solids, including viscous solids, vibrations and waves in crystals with dislocations, and a chapter on the mechanics of liquid crystals.

=== Volume 8 ===
- Landau, Lev D.; Lifshitz, Evgeny M. (1960). Electrodynamics of Continuous Media. Vol. 8 (1st ed.). Pergamon Press. ISBN 978-0-08-009105-1.
- Landau, Lev D.; Lifshitz, Evgeny M.; Pitaevskii, Lev P. (1984). Electrodynamics of Continuous Media. Vol. 8 (2nd ed.). Butterworth-Heinemann. ISBN 978-0-7506-2634-7.

Volume 8 covers electromagnetism in materials, and includes a variety of topics in condensed matter physics, a chapter on magnetohydrodynamics, and another on nonlinear optics.

=== Volume 9 ===
- Lifshitz, Evgeny M.; Pitaevskii, Lev P. (1980). Statistical Physics, Part 2: Theory of the Condensed State. Vol. 9 (1st ed.). Butterworth-Heinemann. ISBN 978-0-7506-2636-1.

Volume 9 builds on the original statistical physics book, with more applications to condensed matter theory.

=== Volume 10 ===
- Lifshitz, Evgeny M.; Pitaevskii, Lev P. (1981). Physical Kinetics. Vol. 10 (1st ed.). Pergamon Press. ISBN 978-0-7506-2635-4.

Volume 10 presents various applications of kinetic theory to condensed matter theory, and to metals, insulators, and phase transitions.

== See also ==
- Lectures on Theoretical Physics
- List of textbooks on classical and quantum mechanics
- List of textbooks in thermodynamics and statistical mechanics
- List of textbooks in electromagnetism
- The Theoretical Minimum
