= Stringari =

Stringari is a surname. Notable people with the surname include:

- Martin Stringari (born 1971), Argentine tennis player
- Sandro Stringari (born 1949), Italian theoretical physicist
