= John Bradbury Sykes =

British editor (1929–1993)

John Bradbury Sykes (26 January 1929 – 1993) was a British physicist, lexicographer, and crossword champion. He was a general editor of the Concise Oxford English Dictionary and the Pocket Oxford English Dictionary, and contributed to several other Oxford dictionaries.

== Early life ==
John Sykes was born on 26 January 1929 in Folkestone, Kent to parents, Stanley William Sykes and Eleanor Sykes. He attended Wallasey Grammar School, Rochdale High School, and St. Lawrence College, Ramsgate. In 1947, he began attending Wadham College at Oxford University where he studied mathematics, eventually graduating with first-class honours in 1950. He then attended Balliol College from 1950 to 1952 as a Henry Skynner senior student and Merton College from 1952 to 1953 as a Harmsworth senior scholar while completing his DPhil thesis: "Some Problems in Radiative Transfer." During this time, Sykes met his wife, a fellow physicist, Avril Barbara Hart. They married in 1955.

== Career ==
After completing his DPhil, Sykes served as a senior scientific officer in the theoretical physics division of the Atomic Energy Research Establishment at Harwell. He spent nine months working in astrophysics at the Yerkes Observatory in Williams Bay, Wisconsin from 1956 to 1957. After returning to England, he was appointed head of the translations office at Harwell library where he was responsible for translating and editing translations of scientific writings. Though he only spoke German and Dutch in addition to English, Harwell's records attest that Sykes had scientific reading knowledge of fifteen languages, specializing in Russian translation. He developed his ability to read these languages by first learning the relevant scientific terminology and the grammar of the language without attending to the literature or spoken form. He collaborated on a translation of the ten-volume Course of Theoretical Physics (1958–81) by Russian authors L. Landau and E. Lifshitz. In 1960, he was promoted to principal scientific officer and was elected a fellow of the Institute of Linguists. He edited the Institute's journal, the Incorporated Linguist from 1980 to 1986.

In 1967, Sykes began at the Oxford English Dictionary as a contributor, visiting Walton Crescent on Saturday mornings to write definitions for technical vocabulary, an area which editor Robert Burchfield felt was lacking in resources at the time. In 1971, he left his job at Harwell and became the editor of the Concise Oxford English Dictionary and the Pocket Oxford English Dictionary. He produced the 1982 edition of the Pocket Oxford English Dictionary and the sixth (1976) and seventh (1978) editions of the Concise Oxford English Dictionary. Months later, he was also appointed "deputy chief editor" of the Oxford English Dictionaries. Oxford English Dictionary editor John Simpson noted of Sykes's approach to lexicography: "he was interested in concise definition as an art form in itself." Though he quickly rose to power at the Oxford English Dictionary, Sykes was not trusted with media matters for the dictionary and was asked by Burchfield to refer media inquiries to other members of the press in his absence. Regardless, Sykes served as the center of publicity for the press around the time the new edition of the Concise Oxford English Dictionary was published, as interviewers were intrigued by his crossword solving abilities. One notable interview given by Sykes to The New York Times was craftily titled, "A British Concise Dictionary. Editor, Finding Good Hunting In Judiciously Knowing Lexicography, Muses Nightly Over Puzzle Questions, Revealing Sensitivity to Uncommon Verbally Wayward Xenogamy, Yielding Zymosis".

In 1977, Pergamon Press, another Oxford based publisher published The Pergamon Dictionary of Perfect Spelling, a new dictionary to be used in schools. However, the press initially hoped to name the dictionary the "Pergamon Oxford Perfect Spelling Dictionary" which sparked outrage by the Oxford University Press (OUP), which objected to the use of "Oxford" in the name. While the resulting legal action favoured the OUP, during this time Burchfield discovered that Sykes had contributed to the new Pergamon dictionary after addressing some questions about lexicography for the Pergamon editor, the daughter of the Pergamon Press owner. Burchfield was upset with Sykes for making the OUP appear as though they had been aware of the Pergamon dictionary's name the entire time, making the OUP appear malicious with the later legal challenge. In response Sykes gave up the Deputy Chief Editor title and assumed the title of Assistant Chief Editor. He was subsequently assigned more low-profile lexicographical work, such as managing the materials of James Wyllie's unfinished dictionary of synonyms and assisting with research for the new Supplement to the Oxford English Dictionary's scientific definitions. According to editor Peter Gilliver, "while his considerable lexicographical skills, and his remarkable range of linguistic and other abilities, were widely recognized, the combination of these with a degree of innocence in other matters seems to have left Burchfield at a loss as to what to do with him".

Sykes later became head of the OUP's new German dictionaries department, where he worked to produce the Oxford-Duden German Dictionary, published in 1990 in collaboration with Dudenverlag. His final role was the general editorship of the 1993 New Shorter Oxford English Dictionary. He was working on a new dictionary of word origins when he died of heart disease at his home on September 6, 1993.

== Personal life ==
Sykes was an avid solver of crossword puzzles. He achieved national fame for being a ten-time Times national crossword champion. He enjoyed playing chess and bridge in his free time. He died in 1993 at the age of 64 and was survived by his former wife and son.
