= Exciton-polariton =

Light-matter quasiparticle

In physics, the exciton–polariton is a type of polariton; a hybrid light and matter quasiparticle arising from the strong coupling of the electromagnetic dipolar oscillations of excitons (either in bulk or quantum wells) and photons. Because light excitations are observed classically as photons, which are massless particles, they do not therefore have mass, like a physical particle. This property makes them a quasiparticle.

== Theory ==
The coupling of the two oscillators, photons modes in the semiconductor optical microcavity and excitons of the quantum wells, results in the energy anticrossing of the bare oscillators, giving rise to the two new normal modes for the system, known as the upper and lower polariton resonances (or branches). The energy shift is proportional to the coupling strength (dependent, e.g., on the field and polarization overlaps). The higher energy or upper mode (UPB, upper polariton branch) is characterized by the photonic and exciton fields oscillating in-phase, while the LPB (lower polariton branch) mode is characterized by them oscillating with phase-opposition. Microcavity exciton–polaritons inherit some properties from both of their roots, such as a light effective mass (from the photons) and a capacity to interact with each other (from the strong exciton nonlinearities) and with the environment (including the internal phonons, which provide thermalization, and the outcoupling by radiative losses). In most cases the interactions are repulsive, at least between polariton quasi-particles of the same spin type (intra-spin interactions) and the nonlinearity term is positive (increase of total energy, or blueshift, upon increasing density).

Researchers also studied the long-range transport in organic materials linked to optical microcavities and demonstrated that exciton-polaritons propagate over several microns. This was done in order to prove that exciton-polaritons propagate over several microns and that the interplay between the molecular disorder and long-range correlations induced by coherent mixing with light leads to a mobility transition between diffusive and ballistic transport.

== Other features ==
Polaritons are also characterized by non-parabolic energy–momentum dispersion relations, which limit the validity of the parabolic effective-mass approximation to a small range of momenta. They also have a spin degree-of-freedom, making them spinorial fluids able to sustain different polarization textures. Exciton-polaritons are composite bosons which can be observed to form Bose–Einstein condensates, and sustain polariton superfluidity and quantum vortices and are prospected for emerging technological applications. Many experimental works currently focus on polariton lasers, optically addressed transistors, nonlinear states such as solitons and shock waves, long-range coherence properties and phase transitions, quantum vortices and spinorial patterns. Modelization of exciton-polariton fluids mainly rely on the use of GPE (Gross–Pitaevskii equations) which are in the form of nonlinear Schrödinger equations.

== See also ==
- Bose–Einstein condensation of polaritons
- Bose–Einstein condensation of quasiparticles
- Polariton superfluid
