= Lev Pitaevskii =

Russian theoretical physicist (1933–2022)

- Лев Питаевский
- Born: 18 January 1933; Saratov, Russian SFSR, USSR
- Died: 23 August 2022 (aged 89); Rovereto, Italy
- Education: Saratov State University
- Known for: Gross–Pitaevskii equation, Superfluidity, Course of Theoretical Physics, van der Waals interactions, Casimir Effect
- Scientific career
- Fields: Theoretical physics
- Workplaces: Moscow Institute of Physics and Technology, University of Trento, Israel Institute of Technology
- Doctoral advisor: Lev Landau
- Doctoral students: Mauro Antezza

Lev Petrovich Pitaevskii (Russian: Лев Петро́вич Пита́евский [ˈlʲef pʲɪˈtrovʲɪtɕ pʲɪˈtajɪfskʲɪj]; 18 January 1933 – 23 August 2022) was a Russian theoretical physicist, who made contributions to the theory of quantum mechanics, electrodynamics, low-temperature physics, plasma physics, and condensed matter physics. Together with his PhD supervisor Evgeny Lifshitz and with Vladimir Berestetskii, he was also the co-author of a few volumes of the influential Landau–Lifshitz Course of Theoretical Physics series. His academic status was professor.

== Education ==
Pitaevskii was born in Saratov on 18 January 1933.

He graduated from Saratov State University in 1955. In 1958, he joined the staff of the Institute of Physical Problems of the Russian Academy of Sciences. In 1971, he became a professor at the Moscow Institute of Physics and Technology.

== Research ==
Collaborating with Vitaly Ginzburg, Pitaevskii developed a theory of superfluidity in the neighbourhood of a transition point. He showed that, at sufficiently low temperatures, liquid helium-3 should undergo a transition to the superfluid state.

Lev Pitaevskii was educated at the Landau school in Moscow. He was a PhD student of Lev Landau and during the first years of his scientific activity at the Institute for Physical Problems (now Kapitza Institute), he made contributions to the theory of condensed matter physics, including the most celebrated paper on quantized vortices where he developed what is now called the Gross–Pitaevskii theory of Bose–Einstein condensates, one of the theories more systematically used to describe the physics of ultracold atomic gases nowadays. Another famous paper was written in collaboration with Igor E. Dzyaloshinsky and Evgeny Lifshitz on the van der Waals forces where the theory of the thermal and quantum fluctuations of the electromagnetic field was developed in a systematic way with important implications on modern applications to solid state physics and atomic physics.

Lev Pitaevskii started collaborating with the University of Trento at the end of the 1980s through a series of long term visits. After a few years spent at the Israel Institute of Technology in Haifa he eventually became professor of Trento University in 1998. After that, he worked at the Bose-Einstein Condensation Center (BEC Center) in Trento, a joint initiative of the Italian National Institute of Optics (part of CNR) in Italy and of the Physics Department of the University of Trento.

Since November 2022, the Bose-Einstein Condensation Center in Trento has been renamed after him as "Pitaevskii Center on Bose-Einstein Condensation", in honour of his outstanding achievements and in acknowledgement for his long time contributions.

== Honours and awards ==
- 1987 – Landau Prize in recognition of his research in plasma physics,
- 1997 – Eugene Feenberg Memorial Medal, "for his seminal contributions to the theory of Bose superfluids and the helium liquids, specifically for his studies of fluctuations close to the lambda transition and of elementary excitations and vorticity in a superfluid, which have provided a cornerstone of our understanding of key aspects of superfluid 4He and that has now expanded to the field of cold bosonic atoms"
- 2003 – Aquila di San Venceslao Highest Honour from the city of Trento
- 2008 – Landau Gold Medal in recognition of his contributions to modern theoretical physics, including the theory of Bose condensation of the Gross–Pitaevskii and for his contribution to the writing of new and previously unreleased update parts of the world-famous course in theoretical physics Landau–Lifshitz.
- 2012 - PhD Honoris Causa at the Université Montpellier (France)
- 2013 - PhD Honoris Causa at the University of Innsbruck (Austria)
- 2013 - PhD Honoris Causa at Texas A&M University (USA)
- 2018 - Pomeranchuk Prize awarded together with Giorgio Parisi
- 2018 - Enrico Fermi Prize Italian Physical Society, awarded together with Federico Capasso and Erio Tosatti)
- 2019 - BEC Senior Award awarded together with Sandro Stringari
- 2021 - Lars Onsager Prize for originating the Gross-Pitaevskii theory of non-uniform Bose-Einstein condensates and subsequent extensive contributions to the theory of quantum fluids, especially as applied to ultracold atomic gases.

== Works ==
=== Books and monographs ===
See Course of Theoretical Physics for his contributions to that series.

- L. P. Pitaevskii, S. Stringari (2016). Bose-Einstein Condensation and Superfluidity. International Series of Monographs on Physics. Oxford University Press. p. 576. ISBN 9780198758884.

=== Papers ===
- "L. Pitaevskii". inspirehep.
