= Orly Alter =

Physicist and geneticist

- אורלי אלטר
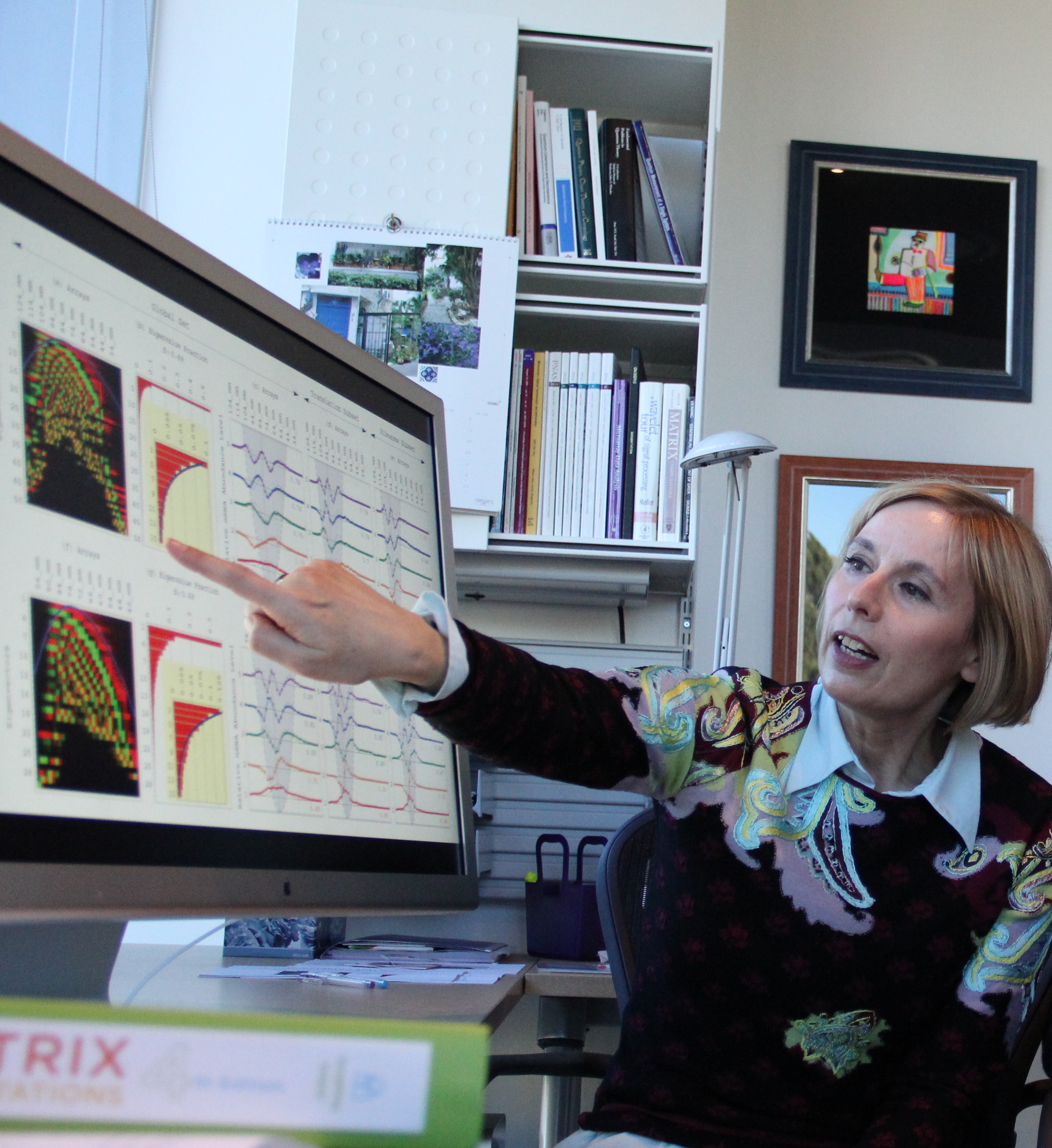
- Orly Alter in 2013
- Born: Tel Aviv, Israel

Academic background
- Education: Tel Aviv University; Stanford University
- Thesis: Impossibility of determining the quantum wavefunction of a single system and a fundamental limit to external force detection (1999)
- Doctoral advisor: Yoshihisa Yamamoto

Academic work
- Notable ideas: eigengene, multi-tensor comparative spectral decomposition

Orly Alter (Hebrew: אורלי אלטר) is an Israeli-American physicist, geneticist, and mathematician, and a USTAR associate professor of bioengineering and human genetics at the Scientific Computing and Imaging Institute and the Huntsman Cancer Institute at the University of Utah. She has published on quantum measurement, genomic signal processing, and tensor decompositions.

== Education and career ==
Alter began attending school at Tel Aviv University in Israel and graduated in October 1989 magna cum laude with her bachelors of science in physics. After receiving her undergraduate degree, she began pursuing her Ph.D. in applied physics at the Stanford University in California, USA. She completed her Ph.D. with a thesis on "Impossibility of Determining the Quantum Wavefunction of a Single System and a Fundamental Limit to External Force Detection," under the mentorship of Yoshihisa Yamamoto in January 1999 and then moved onto a postdoctoral fellowship in genetics, remaining at Stanford. Alter moved to the University of Utah in 2010, where she joined the Scientific Computing and Imaging Institute as a USTAR Associate Professor of Bioengineering.

Following this, she became a member of Cancer Control and Population Sciences Program, and was co-founder and Chief Scientific Officer of Prism AI Therapeutics in 2024.

== Research ==
Alter has one published book named Quantum Measurement of a Single System, co-authored with Yamamoto, and another book in preparation, Genomic Signal Processing: Discovery of Principles of Nature from Matrix and Tensor Modeling of Large-Scale Molecular Biological Data. Alter's work on finding patterns in DNA finds predictors indicative of a woman's risk for ovarian cancer, and she uses mathematical models to improve the outcomes for women with ovarian cancer.

Alter's team identified a DNA pattern as a predictor of survival in glioblastoma patients using new mathematical methods, which was reported in 2020.

== Awards and recognition ==
In 2005 Alter was selected by the International Linear Algebra Society to give the Linear Algebra and its Applications Lecture. Alter was an American Association of Physicists in Medicine Science Council Session Winner in 2014.

== Selected publications ==
- Alter, Orly; Brown, Patrick O.; Botstein, David (29 August 2000). "Singular value decomposition for genome-wide expression data processing and modeling". Proceedings of the National Academy of Sciences. 97 (18): 10101–10106. Bibcode:2000PNAS...9710101A. doi:10.1073/pnas.97.18.10101. ISSN 0027-8424. PMC 27718. PMID 10963673.
- Alter, Orly; Brown, Patrick O.; Botstein, David (18 March 2003). "Generalized singular value decomposition for comparative analysis of genome-scale expression data sets of two different organisms". Proceedings of the National Academy of Sciences. 100 (6): 3351–3356. Bibcode:2003PNAS..100.3351A. doi:10.1073/pnas.0530258100. ISSN 0027-8424. PMC 152296. PMID 12631705.
- Omberg, Larsson; Golub, Gene H.; Alter, Orly (20 November 2007). "A tensor higher-order singular value decomposition for integrative analysis of DNA microarray data from different studies". Proceedings of the National Academy of Sciences. 104 (47): 18371–18376. Bibcode:2007PNAS..10418371O. doi:10.1073/pnas.0709146104. ISSN 0027-8424. PMC 2147680. PMID 18003902.
- Alter, Orly. Genomic Signal Processing: Discovery of Principles of Nature from Matrix and Tensor Modeling. Wiley. ISBN 978-1-119-07837-1.
