= Debbie Leung =

Canada Research Chair

Debbie Leung is a University Research Chair at the Institute for Quantum Computing at the University of Waterloo, where she is also affiliated with the Department of Combinatorics and Optimization. She works in theoretical quantum information processing. Before joining the University of Waterloo, she spent four months (September-December 2002) at the workshop on Quantum Computation, at the Simons Laufer Mathematical Sciences Institute, in Berkeley.

Leung's research areas include quantum cryptography, quantum communication, measurement-based quantum computation, fault-tolerant quantum computation and error correction.

Leung earned her Bachelor of Science in mathematics and physics from Caltech in 1995. She received her PhD under doctoral advisors Yoshihisa Yamamoto and Isaac Chuang at Stanford. In her PhD thesis, entitled "Towards Robust Quantum Computation", she demonstrated the surprising result that approximate quantum error-correcting codes can outperform their exact counterparts.

In 2002, Leung won the Tolman postdoctoral fellowship at the Institute of Quantum Information at Caltech and the Croucher Fellowship. In 2005, she won a 10-year Tier II Canada Research Chair in Quantum Communications. Her recent work focuses on quantum channel capacities, quantum network coding, and quantum information processing with limited entanglement.
