= Lyddane–Sachs–Teller relation =

In condensed matter physics, the Lyddane–Sachs–Teller relation (or LST relation) determines the ratio of the natural frequency of longitudinal optic lattice vibrations (phonons) ($\omega_\text{LO}$) of an ionic crystal to the natural frequency of the transverse optical lattice vibration ($\omega_\text{TO}$) for long wavelengths (zero wavevector). The ratio is that of the static permittivity $\varepsilon_{\text{st}}$ to the permittivity for frequencies in the visible range $\varepsilon_{\infty}$.

$\frac{\omega_\text{LO}^2}{\omega_\text{TO}^2} = \frac{\varepsilon_{\text{st}}}{\varepsilon_{\infty}}$

The relation holds for systems with a single optical branch, such as cubic systems with two different atoms per unit cell. For systems with many phonon branches, the relation does not necessarily hold, as the permittivity for any pair of longitudinal and transverse modes will be altered by the other modes in the system. The Lyddane–Sachs–Teller relation is named after the physicists R. H. Lyddane, Robert G. Sachs, and Edward Teller.

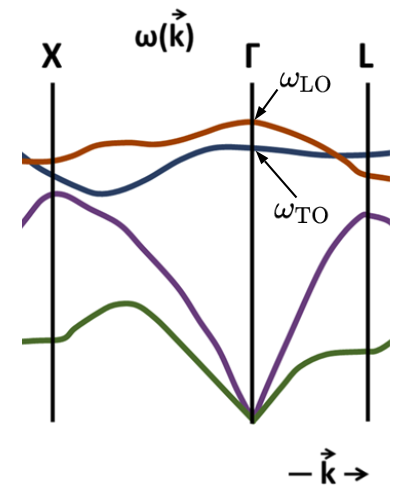
Phonon band structure in GaAs. The separation between LO and TO phonon frequencies near the Γ-point (small wave vectors) is described by the LST relation. Note this plot shows much higher wavevectors than considered below, and the scale cannot not show the hybridization of the TO branch with light (which would be confined extremely close to Γ).

== Origin and limitations ==
The Lyddane–Sachs–Teller relation applies to optical lattice vibrations that have an associated net polarization density, so that they can produce long ranged electromagnetic fields (over ranges much longer than the inter-atom distances). The relation assumes an idealized polar ("infrared active") optical lattice vibration that gives a contribution to the frequency-dependent permittivity described by a lossless Lorentzian oscillator:

$$\varepsilon(\omega) = \varepsilon(\infty) + (\varepsilon(\infty)-\varepsilon_{st})\frac{\omega_\text{TO}^2}{\omega^2 - \omega_\text{TO}^2},$$

where $\varepsilon(\infty)$ is the permittivity at high frequencies, $\varepsilon_{st}$ is the static DC permittivity, and $\omega_\text{TO}$ is the "natural" oscillation frequency of the lattice vibration taking into account only the short-ranged (microscopic) restoring forces.

Dispersion relation of phonon polaritons in GaP. Red curves are the uncoupled phonon and photon dispersion relations, black curves are the result of coupling (from top to bottom: upper polariton, LO phonon, lower polariton). The LST relation relates the frequencies of the horizontal red curve ($\omega_\text{TO}$) and the black curve intercept at k=0 ($\omega_\text{LO}$).

The above equation can be plugged into Maxwell's equations to find the complete set of normal modes including all restoring forces (short-ranged and long-ranged), which are sometimes called phonon polaritons. These modes are plotted in the figure. At every wavevector there are three distinct modes:

- a longitudinal wave mode occurs with an essentially flat dispersion at frequency $\omega_\text{LO}$.

- In this mode, the electric field is parallel to the wavevector and produces no transverse currents, hence it is purely electric (there is no associated magnetic field).
- The longitudinal wave is basically dispersionless, and appears as a flat line in the plot at frequency $\omega_\text{LO}$. This remains 'split off' from the bare oscillation frequency even at high wave vectors, because the importance of electric restoring forces does not diminish at high wavevectors.

- two transverse wave modes appear (actually, four modes, in pairs with identical dispersion), with complex dispersion behavior.

- In these modes, the electric field is perpendicular to the wavevector, producing transverse currents, which in turn generate magnetic fields. As light is also a transverse electromagnetic wave, the behaviour is described as a coupling of the transverse vibration modes with the light inside the material (in the figure, shown as red dashed lines).
- At high wavevectors, the lower mode is primarily vibrational. This mode approaches the 'bare' frequency $\omega_\text{TO}$ because magnetic restoring forces can be neglected: the transverse currents produce a small magnetic field and the magnetically induced electric field is also very small.
- At zero, or low wavevector the upper mode is primarily vibrational and its frequency instead coincides with the longitudinal mode, with frequency $\omega_\text{LO}$. This coincidence is required by symmetry considerations and occurs due to electrodynamic retardation effects that make the transverse magnetic back-action behave identically to the longitudinal electric back-action.

The longitudinal mode appears at the frequency where the permittivity passes through zero, i.e. $\varepsilon(\omega_\text{LO}) = 0$. Solving this for the Lorentzian resonance described above gives the Lyddane–Sachs–Teller relation.

Since the Lyddane–Sachs–Teller relation is derived from the lossless Lorentzian oscillator, it may break down in realistic materials where the permittivity function is more complicated for various reasons:

- Real phonons have losses (also known as damping or dissipation).
- Materials may have multiple phonon resonances that add together to produce the permittivity.
- There may be other electrically active degrees of freedom (notably, mobile electrons) and non-Lorentzian oscillators.

In the case of multiple, lossy Lorentzian oscillators, there are generalized Lyddane–Sachs–Teller relations available. Most generally, the permittivity cannot be described as a combination of Lorentizan oscillators, and the longitudinal mode frequency can only be found as a complex zero in the permittivity function.

== Anharmonic crystals ==
The most general Lyddane–Sachs–Teller relation applicable in crystals where the phonons are affected by anharmonic damping has been derived in Ref. and reads as

$\frac{|\omega_\text{LO}|^2}{|\omega_\text{TO}|^2} = \frac{\varepsilon_{\text{st}}}{\varepsilon_{\infty}}$

the absolute value is necessary since the phonon frequencies are now complex, with an imaginary part that is equal to the finite lifetime of the phonon, and proportional to the anharmonic phonon damping (described by Klemens' theory for optical phonons).

== Non-polar crystals ==
A corollary of the LST relation is that for non-polar crystals, the LO and TO phonon modes are degenerate, and thus $\varepsilon_\text{st}=\varepsilon_\infty$. This indeed holds for the purely covalent crystals of the group IV elements, such as for diamond (C), silicon, and germanium.

== Reststrahlen effect ==
In the frequencies between $\omega_\text{TO}$ and $\omega_\text{LO}$ there is 100% reflectivity. This range of frequencies (band) is called the Reststrahl band. The name derives from the German reststrahl which means "residual ray".

== Example with NaCl ==
The static and high-frequency dielectric constants of NaCl are $\varepsilon_\text{st}=5.9$ and $\varepsilon_\infty=2.25$, and the TO phonon frequency $\nu_\text{TO}$ is $4.9$ THz. Using the LST relation, we are able to calculate that

$\nu_\text{LO}=\sqrt{\varepsilon_\text{st}/\varepsilon_\infty}\times\nu_\text{TO}=7.9$ THz

== Experimental methods ==
=== Raman spectroscopy ===
One of the ways to experimentally determine $\omega_\text{TO}$ and $\omega_\text{LO}$ is through Raman spectroscopy. As previously mentioned, the phonon frequencies used in the LST relation are those corresponding to the TO and LO branches evaluated at the gamma-point ($k=0$) of the Brillouin zone. This is also the point where the photon-phonon coupling most often occurs for the Stokes shift measured in Raman. Hence two peaks will be present in the Raman spectrum, each corresponding to the TO and LO phonon frequency.

== See also ==
- Reststrahlen effect
