= Yoshihisa Yamamoto (scientist) =

Japanese applied physicist (born 1950)

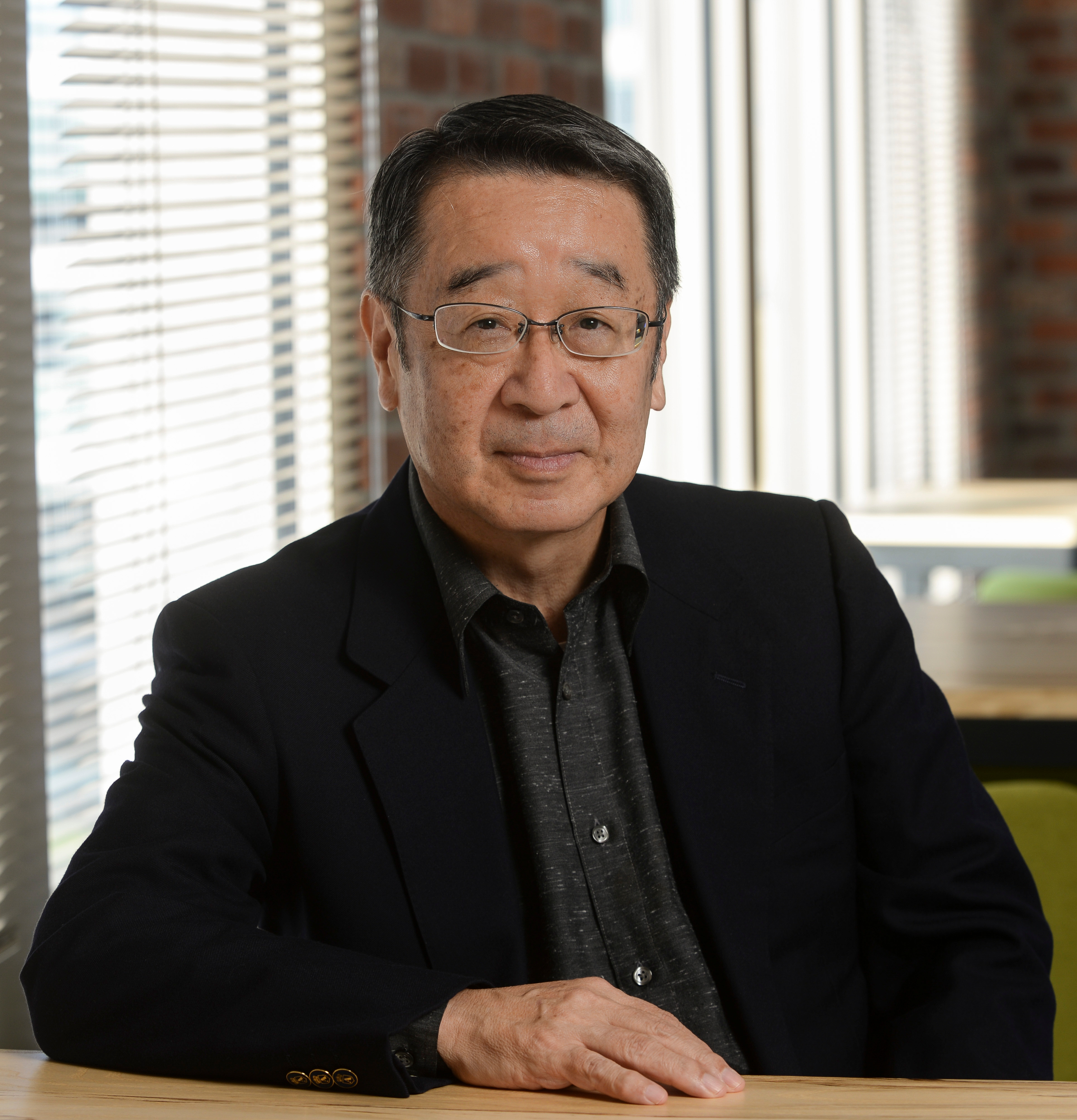
- Born: November 21, 1950 (age 75); Tokyo, Japan
- Education: Tokyo Institute of Technology; University of Tokyo
- Known for: Coherent optical communications; Quantum-dot single-photon sources; Differential phase-shift quantum key distribution; Optical control of quantum-dot spin qubits; BEC of exciton-polaritons; Coherent Ising machines;
- Awards: Willis Lamb Award (2022). Okawa Prize (2011). Medal of Honor with Purple Ribbon (2005). IEEE LEOS Quantum Electronics Award (2000). Matsuo Science Prize (2000). Nishina Prize (1992). Carl Zeiss Award (1992).
- Scientific career
- Doctoral advisors: Hisayoshi Yanai; Takeshi Kamiya
- Other academic advisors: Yasuharu Suematsu
- Doctoral students: Isaac Chuang (MIT); Hui Cao (Yale); Debbie Leung (Waterloo); Kai-Mei Fu (Washington); Eleni Diamanti (Pierre-Marie Curie); Orly Alter

Yoshihisa Yamamoto (山本 喜久, Yamamoto Yoshihisa) is the director of Physics & Informatics Laboratories (PHI Labs), NTT Research, Inc. He is also Professor (Emeritus) at Stanford University and National Institute of Informatics (Tokyo).

== Biography ==
Yamamoto was born in Tokyo on November 21, 1950. In 1973 he received his B.S. degree from Tokyo Institute of Technology. He continued his studies at the University of Tokyo where he received his M.S. in 1975 and Ph.D. in 1978. From 1978 to 1992, he worked at NTT Basic Research Laboratories in Tokyo. Since 1992, he has been a professor of applied physics and electrical engineering at Stanford University in the United States and currently a professor (emeritus). Since 2003, he also has been a professor at National Institute of Informatics in Tokyo and currently a professor (emeritus). In 2019, he became a founding director of NTT PHI Labs in Silicon Valley, California, the United States.

== Work ==
Yamamoto's scientific focuses in the 1980s were coherent optical fiber communications, optical amplifier repeater systems, photon number squeezing in semiconductor lasers, quantum non-demolition (QND) measurements and other experimental and theoretical quantum optics subjects. Some of Yamamoto's key works from this era are proposals for how to physically realize photon-number squeezing, QND measurement, and a gate model quantum computer using single atoms and photons. His most prominent work in the 1990s is in semiconductor cavity quantum electrodynamics (especially involving microcavities and quantum wells) and quantum transport effects in mesoscopic devices.

During the 2000s, his most important work was on the development of optically-active quantum dots as a platform for quantum information processing (both as single-photon sources and as hosts for spin qubits.) Another important work was on exciton-polariton condensation effects. Yamamoto was also active in the development of security theory and realization of quantum key distribution protocols. Landmark papers from this era include the demonstration of indistinguishable photons from a single quantum dot; the proposal for biexciton cascade emission as a method for generating entangled photons from a single quantum dot (this is the proposal underlying essentially all QD entangled-photon sources, such as those reviewed in), and control of a single spin qubit in a quantum dot using optical pulses.

During the 2010s, his work has continued on exploring quantum dots as a platform for building both quantum repeaters and quantum computers. One highlight was the co-first demonstration (with Ataç İmamoğlu's group at ETH) of entanglement between a spin in a quantum dot and a photon emitted by it. Work on exciton-polaritons continued. Since 2012, Yamamoto has studied the required number of physical qubits and expected computational time in a gate-model fault-tolerant quantum computer and pioneered the development of a novel quantum/classical hybrid computer, called coherent Ising machine inspired by developments in digital coherent optical communications and degenerate optical parametric oscillators.

== Awards ==
Yamamoto is a fellow of the Optical Society of America (now Optica), the American Physical Society, and the Japan Society of Applied Physics. In 1985, Yamamoto received the Achievement Award of the Institute of Electronics, Information and Communication Engineers (IEICE) of Japan on his early work on coherent optical communications. In 1992, he received the Nishina Prize and the Carl Zeiss Award on his pioneering work on squeezed state generation in semiconductor lasers. In 2000, he received the IEEE LEOS Quantum Electronics Award and the Matsuo Science Prize. In 2005, he received the Medal of Honour with Purple Ribbon from the Government of Japan. In 2010, he was the Hermann Anton Haus Lecturer at MIT and gave a lecture on exciton-polariton condensation. In 2011, he received the Okawa Prize on his pioneering work on single photon generation from a quantum dot. In 2022, he received the Willis Lamb Award on his pioneering work on coherent Ising machines.
