= Phonon polariton =

Quasiparticle form phonon and photon coupling

In condensed matter physics, a phonon polariton is a type of quasiparticle that can form in a diatomic ionic crystal due to coupling of transverse optical phonons and photons. They are particular type of polariton, which behave like bosons. Phonon polaritons occur in the region where the wavelength and energy of phonons and photons are similar, as to adhere to the avoided crossing principle.

Phonon polariton spectra have traditionally been studied using Raman spectroscopy. The recent advances in (scattering-type) scanning near-field optical microscopy [(s-)SNOM] and atomic force microscopy (AFM) have made it possible to observe the polaritons in a more direct way.

== Theory ==
A phonon polariton is a type of quasiparticle that can form in some crystals due to the coupling of photons and lattice vibrations. They have properties of both light and sound waves, and can travel at very slow speeds in the material. They are useful for manipulating electromagnetic fields at nanoscale and enhancing optical phenomena. Phonon polaritons only result from coupling of transverse optical phonons, this is due to the particular form of the dispersion relation of the phonon and photon and their interaction. Photons consist of electromagnetic waves, which are always transverse. Therefore, they can only couple with transverse phonons in crystals.

Near $\mathbf{k}=0$ the dispersion relation of an acoustic phonon can be approximated as being linear, with a particular gradient giving a dispersion relation of the form $\omega_{\rm ac} = v_{\rm ac}k$, with $v_{\rm ac}$ the speed of the wave, $\omega_{\rm ac}$ the angular frequency and k the absolute value of the wave vector $\mathbf{k}$. The dispersion relation of photons is also linear, being also of the form $\omega_{\rm p} = ck$, with c being the speed of light in vacuum. The difference lies in the magnitudes of their speeds, the speed of photons is many times larger than the speed for the acoustic phonons. The dispersion relations will therefore never cross each other, resulting in a lack of coupling. The dispersion relations touch at $\mathbf{k}=0$, but since the waves have no energy, no coupling will occur.

Optical phonons, by contrast, have a non-zero angular frequency at $\mathbf{k}=0$ and have a negative slope, which is also much smaller in magnitude to that of photons. This will result in the crossing of the optical phonon branch and the photon dispersion, leading to their coupling and the forming of a phonon polariton.

=== Dispersion relation ===
The behavior of the phonon polaritons can be described by the dispersion relation. This dispersion relation is most easily derived for diatomic ion crystals with optical isotropy, for example sodium chloride and zinc sulfide. Since the atoms in the crystal are charged, any lattice vibration which changes the relative distance between the two atoms in the unit cell will change the dielectric polarization of the material. To describe these vibrations, it is useful to introduce the parameter w, which is given by:

$$\mathbf{w} = \mathbf{q} \sqrt{\frac{\mu}{V}}$$

Where

- $\mathbf{q}$ is the displacement of the positive atom relative to the negative atom;
- μ is the reduced mass of the two atoms;
- V is the volume of the unit cell.

Using this parameter, the behavior of the lattice vibrations for long waves can be described by the following equations:

$$\ddot{\mathbf{w}} = -{\omega_0}^2\mathbf{w} +
(\frac{\epsilon_0-\epsilon_\infty}{4\pi})^{1/2}\omega_0\mathbf{E}$$
$$\mathbf{P} = (\frac{\epsilon_0-\epsilon_\infty}{4\pi})^{1/2}\omega_0\mathbf{w} +
(\frac{\epsilon_\infty-1}{4\pi})\mathbf{E}$$

Where

- $\ddot{\mathbf{w}}$ denotes the double time derivative of $\mathbf{w}$
- $\epsilon_0$ is the static dielectric constant
- $\epsilon_\infty$ is the high-frequency dielectric constant
- $\omega_0$ is the infrared dispersion frequency
- $\mathbf{E}$ is the electric field
- $\mathbf{P}$ is the dielectric polarization.

For the full coupling between the phonon and the photon, we need the four Maxwell's equations in matter. Since, macroscopically, the crystal is uncharged and there is no current, the equations can be simplified. A phonon polariton must abide all of these six equations. To find solutions to this set of equations, we write the following trial plane wave solutions for $\mathbf{w}$ , $\mathbf{E}$ and $\mathbf{P}$:

$$\mathbf{w}=\mathbf{w_0}e^{i(\mathbf{k}\cdot \mathbf{x} - \omega t)} + \text{c.c.}$$
$$\mathbf{P}=\mathbf{P_0}e^{i(\mathbf{k}\cdot \mathbf{x} - \omega t)} + \text{c.c.}$$
$$\mathbf{E}=\mathbf{E_0}e^{i(\mathbf{k}\cdot \mathbf{x} - \omega t)} + \text{c.c.}$$

Dispersion relation of phonon polaritons in GaP. Red curves are the uncoupled phonon and photon dispersion relations, black curves are the result of coupling (from top to bottom: upper polariton, LO phonon, lower polariton).

Where $\mathbf{k}$ denotes the wave vector of the plane wave, $\mathbf{x}$ the position, t the time, and ω the angular frequency. Notice that wave vector $\vec k$ should be perpendicular to the electric field and the magnetic field. Solving the resulting equations for ω and k, the magnitude of the wave vector, yields the following dispersion relation, and furthermore an expression for the optical dielectric constant:

$$\frac{k^2c^2}{\omega^2} = \epsilon_{\infty} +
\frac{\epsilon_0-\epsilon_{\infty}}{{\omega_0}^2-\omega^2}{\omega_0}^2
= \epsilon(\omega)$$

With $\epsilon(\omega)$ the optical dielectric constant.

The solution of this dispersion relation has two branches, an upper branch and a lower branch (see also the figure). If the slope of the curve is low, the particle is said to behave "phononlike", and if the slope is high the particle behaves "photonlike", owing these names to the slopes of the regular dispersion curves for phonons and photons. The phonon polariton behaves phononlike for low k in the upper branch, and for high k in the lower branch. Conversely, the polariton behaves photonlike for high k in the upper branch, low k in the lower branch.

=== Limit behaviour of the dispersion relation ===
The dispersion relation describes the behaviour of the coupling. The coupling of the phonon and the photon is the most promininent in the region where the original transverse disperion relations would have crossed. In the limit of large k, the solid lines of both branches approach the dotted lines, meaning, the coupling does not have a large impact on the behaviour of the vibrations.

Towards the right of the crossing point, the upper branch behaves like a photon. The physical interpretation of this effect is that the frequency becomes too high for the ions to partake in the vibration, causing them to be essentially static. This results in a dispersion relation resembling one of a regular photon in a crystal. The lower branch in this region behaves, because of their low phase velocity compared to the photons, as regular transverse lattice vibrations.

=== Lyddane–Sachs–Teller relation ===
The longitudinal optical phonon frequency $\omega_L$ is defined by the zero of the equation for the dielectric constant. Writing the equation for the dielectric constant in a different way yields:

$$\epsilon(\omega)=
\frac{{\omega_0}^2\epsilon_0-\omega^2\epsilon_{\infty}}{{\omega_0}^2-\omega^2}$$

Solving the equation $\epsilon(\omega_L)=0$ yields:

$$\frac{{\omega_L}^2}{{\omega_0}^2}=\frac{\epsilon_0}{\epsilon_{\infty}}$$

This equation gives the ratio of the frequency of the longitudinal optical phonon ($\omega_L$), to the frequency of the transverse optical phonon ($\omega_0$) in diatomic cubic ionic crystals, and is known as the Lyddane-Sachs-Teller relation. The ratio $\omega_L/\omega_0$ can be found using inelastic neutron scattering experiments.

== Surface phonon polariton ==
Surface phonon polariton(SPhPs) are a specific kind of phonon polariton. They are formed by the coupling of optical surface phonon, instead of normal phonons, and light, resulting in an electromagnetic surface wave. They are similar to surface plasmon polaritons, although studied to a far lesser extent. The applications are far ranging from materials with negative index of refraction to high-density IR data storage.

One other application is in the cooling of microelectronics. Phonons are the main source of heat conductivity in materials, where optical phonons contribute far less than acoustic phonons. This is because of the relatively low group velocity of optical phonons. When the thickness of the material decreases, the conductivity of via acoustic also decreases, since surface scattering increases. This microelectronics are getting smaller and smaller, reductions is getting more problematic. Although optical phonons themselves do not have a high thermal conductivity, SPhPs do seem to have this. So they may be an alternative means of cooling these electronic devices.

== Experimental observation ==
Most observations of phonon polaritons are made of surface phonon polaritons, since these can be easily probed by Raman spectroscopy or AFM.

=== Raman spectroscopy ===
As with any Raman experiment, a laser is pointed at the material being studied. If the correct wavelength is chosen, this laser can induce the formation of a polariton on the sample. Looking at the Stokes shifted emitted radiation and by using the conservation of energy and the known laser energy, one can calculate the polariton energy, with which one can construct the dispersion relation.

=== SNOM and AFM ===
The induction of polaritons is very similar to that in Raman experiments, with a few differences. With the extremely high spatial resolution of SNOM, one can induce polaritons very locally in the sample. This can be done continuously, producing a continuous wave(CW) of polariton, or with an ultrafast pulse, producing a polariton with a very high temporal footprint. In both cases the polaritons are detected by the tip of the AFM, this signal is then used to calculate the energy of the polariton. One can also perform these experiments near the edge of the sample. This will result in the polaritons being reflected. In the case of CW polaritons, standing waves will be created, which will again be detected by the AFM tip. In the case of the polaritons created by the ultrafast laser, no standing wave will be created. The wave can still interfere with itself the moment it is reflected of the edge. Whether one is observing on the bulk surface or close to an edge, the signal is in temporal form. One can Fourier transform this signal, converting the signal into frequency domain, which can used to obtain the dispersion relation.

=== Polaritonics and real-space imaging ===
Phonon polaritons also find use in the field of polaritonics, a field between photonics and electronics. In this field phonon polaritons are used for high speed signal processing and terahertz spectroscopy. The real-space imaging of phonon polaritons was made possible by projecting them onto a CCD camera.

== See also ==
- Polariton
- Phonon
- Surface plasmon polariton
