= Plexciton =

Direct energy flows

Plexcitons are polaritonic modes that result from coherently coupled plasmons and excitons. Plexcitons aid direct energy flows in exciton energy transfer (EET). Plexcitons travel for 20 μm, similar to the width of a human hair.

== History ==
Plasmons are a quantity of collective electron oscillations. Excitons are excited electrons bound to the hole produced by their excitation.

Molecular crystal excitons were combined with the collective excitations within metals to create plexcitons. This allowed EET to reach distances of around 20,000 nanometers, an enormous increase over the some 10 nanometers possible previously. However, the transfer direction was uncontrolled.

Topological insulators (TI) act as insulators below their surface, but have conductive surfaces, constraining electrons to move only along that surface. Even materials with moderately flawed surfaces do not impede current flow. Topological plexcitons make use of the properties of TIs to achieve similar control over the direction of current flow.

Plexcitons were found to emerge from an organic molecular layer (excitons) and a metallic film (plasmons). Dirac cones appeared in the plexcitons' two-dimensional band-structure. An external magnetic field created a gap between the cones when the system was interfaced to a magneto-optical layer. The resulting energy gap became populated with topologically protected one-way modes, which traveled only at the system interface.

== Potential applications ==
Plexcitons could potentially offer an appealing platform for exploring exotic matter phases and for controlling nanoscale energy flows.
