= Polariton superfluid =

Polariton superfluid is predicted to be a state of the exciton-polaritons system that combines the characteristics of lasers with those of excellent electrical conductors. Researchers look for this state in a solid state optical microcavity coupled with quantum well excitons. The idea is to create an ensemble of particles known as exciton-polaritons and trap them. Wave behavior in this state results in a light beam similar to that from a laser but possibly more energy efficient.

Unlike traditional superfluids that need temperatures of approximately ~4 K, the polariton superfluid could in principle be stable at much higher temperatures, and might soon be demonstrable at room temperature. Evidence for polariton superfluidity was reported in by Alberto Amo and coworkers, based on the suppressed scattering of the polaritons during their motion.

Although several other researchers are working in the same field, the terminology and conclusions are not completely shared by the different groups. In particular, important properties of superfluids, such as zero viscosity, and of lasers, such as perfect optical coherence, are a matter of debate. Although, there is clear indication of quantized vortices when the pump beam has orbital angular momentum. Furthermore, clear evidence has been demonstrated also for superfluid motion of polaritons, in terms of the Landau criterion and the suppression of scattering from defects when the flow velocity is slower than the speed of sound in the fluid. The same phenomena have been demonstrated in an organic exciton polariton fluid, representing the first achievement of room-temperature superfluidity of a hybrid fluid of photons and excitons.

== See also ==
- Bose–Einstein condensation of polaritons
