= Kai-Mei Fu =

American electrical engineer and physicist

- Education: Princeton University, Stanford University
- Scientific career
- Fields: Physics, Electrical Engineering
- Workplaces: University of Washington
- Doctoral advisor: Yoshihisa Yamamoto

Kai-Mei Fu is an American electrical engineer and physicist. They are an Associate Professor of Physics and Electrical Engineering at the University of Washington where they are the director of the Optical Spintronics and Sensing Lab.

== Training, research, and notable achievements ==
Fu received their A.B. in Physics at Princeton University (2000). They then went on to receive their Ph.D. (2007) at Stanford University with Yoshihisa Yamamoto. They performed their postdoctoral training at the Information and Quantum System Laboratory at Hewlett-Packard Laboratories prior to joining the faculty at the University of Washington in 2011.

Fu has been a longstanding expert on topics concerning defects in crystals. Their research largely considers how understanding defects in materials can be applied towards applications in sensing, alongside the design of photonic devices. While their group addresses a series of different materials, they are considered a leading researcher on single crystal diamond with impurities.

Their research interests include Atomic Physics, Condensed Matter Experiment and Quantum Information.

At the University of Washington, they are active in topics concerning undergraduate research and outreach. They are the co-founder of the UW Science Explorers program in Seattle.

Fu is a founding member of the Molecular Engineering and Materials Center at the University of Washington. Their team has also received recent funding in Quantum Information Science from the National Science Foundation and the Department of Defense via the Ab-Initio Solid-State Quantum Materials MURI program. Fu is also one of the organizers of the newly founded Northwest Quantum Nexus, a research and industry coalition in the Pacific Northwest Region for research in Quantum Information Science. At the University of Washington, they are also a member of the QuantumX focus initiative.

== Awards and honors ==
- NSF CAREER Award (2012)
- Cottrell Scholar Award (2015)
- UW College of Engineering Junior Faculty Award (2015)
- Optica Fellow (2023)
- APS Fellow

== Notable publications ==
- Fu, K.-M. C.; Santori, C.; Barclay, P. E.; Beausoleil, R. G. (2010-03-22). "Conversion of neutral nitrogen-vacancy centers to negatively charged nitrogen-vacancy centers through selective oxidation". Applied Physics Letters. 96 (12): 121907. arXiv:1001.5449. Bibcode:2010ApPhL..96l1907F. doi:10.1063/1.3364135. ISSN 0003-6951. S2CID 98022192.
- Linpeng, Xiayu; Viitaniemi, Maria L.K.; Vishnuradhan, Aswin; Kozuka, Y.; Johnson, Cameron; Kawasaki, M.; Fu, Kai-Mei C. (2018-12-28). "Coherence Properties of Shallow Donor Qubits in $\mathrm{Zn}\mathrm{O}$". Physical Review Applied. 10 (6) 064061. arXiv:1802.03483. doi:10.1103/PhysRevApplied.10.064061. S2CID 51683556.
- Fu, Kai-Mei C.; Rodriguez, Alejandro W.; Hatami, Fariba; Majumdar, Arka; Jin, Weiliang; Lin, Zin; Hestroffer, Karine; Schmidgall, Emma R.; Gould, Michael (2018-12-24). "400%/W second harmonic conversion efficiency in 14 μm-diameter gallium phosphide-on-oxide resonators". Optics Express. 26 (26): 33687–33699. arXiv:1810.06393. Bibcode:2018OExpr..2633687L. doi:10.1364/OE.26.033687. ISSN 1094-4087. PMID 30650802. S2CID 53479406.
