= Bose–Einstein condensation of polaritons =

Polariton condensation

Bose–Einstein condensation of polaritons is a growing field in semiconductor optics research, which exhibits spontaneous coherence similar to a laser, but through a different mechanism. A continuous transition from polariton condensation to lasing can be made similar to that of the crossover from a Bose–Einstein condensate to a BCS state in the context of Fermi gases. Polariton condensation is sometimes called "lasing without inversion".

== Overview ==
Polaritons are bosonic quasiparticles which can be thought of as dressed photons. In an optical cavity, photons have an effective mass, and when the optical resonance in a cavity is brought near in energy to an electronic resonance (typically an exciton) in a medium inside the cavity, the photons become strongly interacting, and repel each other. They therefore act like atoms which can approach equilibrium due to their collisions with each other, and can undergo Bose-Einstein condensation (BEC) at high density or low temperature. The Bose condensate of polaritons then emits coherent light like a laser. Because the mechanism for the onset of coherence is the interactions between the polaritons, and not the optical gain that comes from inversion, the threshold density can be quite low.

== History ==
The theory of polariton BEC was first proposed by Atac Imamoglu and coauthors including Yoshihisa Yamamoto. These authors claimed observation of this effect in a subsequent paper, but this was eventually shown to be standard lasing. In later work in collaboration with the research group of Jacqueline Bloch, the structure was redesigned to include several quantum wells inside the cavity to prevent saturation of the exciton resonance, and in 2002 evidence for nonequilibrium condensation was reported which included photon-photon correlations consistent with spontaneous coherence. Later experimental groups have used essentially the same design. In 2006, the group of Benoit Deveaud and coauthors reported the first widely accepted claim of nonequilibrium Bose–Einstein condensation of polaritons based on measurement of the momentum distribution of the polaritons. Although the system was not in equilibrium, a clear peak in the ground state of the system was seen, a canonical prediction of BEC. Both of these experiments created a polariton gas in an uncontrolled free expansion. In 2007, the experimental group of David Snoke demonstrated nonequilibrium Bose–Einstein condensation of polaritons in a trap, similar to the way atoms are confined in traps for Bose–Einstein condensation experiments. The observation of polariton condensation in a trap was significant because the polaritons were displaced from the laser excitation spot, so that the effect could not be attributed to a simple nonlinear effect of the laser light. Jaqueline Bloch and coworkers observed polariton condensation in 2009, after which many other experimentalists reproduced the effect (for reviews see the bibliography). Evidence for polariton superfluidity was reported in by Alberto Amo and coworkers, based on the suppressed scattering of the polaritons during their motion. This effect has been seen more recently at room temperature, which is the first evidence of room temperature superfluidity, albeit in a highly nonequilibrium system. BEC of plasmon-polaritons has been demonstrated at weak and strong light-matter coupling regimes, in periodic arrays of metal nanoparticles overlaid with dye molecules, operating at room temperature.

== Equilibrium polariton condensation ==
The first clear demonstration of Bose–Einstein condensation of polaritons in equilibrium was reported by a collaboration of David Snoke, Keith Nelson, and coworkers, using high quality structures fabricated by Loren Pfeiffer and Ken West at Princeton. Prior to this result, polariton condensates were always observed out of equilibrium. All of the above studies used optical pumping to create the condensate. Electrical injection, which enables a polariton laser which could be a practical device, was shown in 2013 by two groups.

== Nonequilibrium condensation ==
Polariton condensates are an example, and the most well studied example, of Bose-Einstein condensation of quasiparticles. Because most of the experimental work on polariton condensates used structures with very short polariton lifetime, a large body of theory has addressed the properties of nonequilibrium condensation and superfluidity. In particular, Jonathan Keeling and Iacopo Carusotto and C. Ciuti have shown that although a condensate with dissipation is not a "true" superfluid, it still has a critical velocity for onset of superfluid effects.

== See also ==
- Bose-Einstein condensation of quasiparticles
