= Butterworth-Heinemann =

British publishing company

- Parent company: Elsevier
- Founded: 1990
- Country of origin: United Kingdom
- Headquarters location: Oxford
- Official website: elsevier.com/butterworth-heinemann

Butterworth–Heinemann is a British publishing company specialised in professional information and learning materials for higher education and professional training, in printed and electronic forms. It was formed in 1990 by the merger of Heinemann Professional Publishing and Butterworths Scientific, both subsidiaries of Reed International. With its earlier constituent companies, the founding dates back to 1923.

It has publishing units in Oxford (UK) and Waltham, Massachusetts (United States).

As of 2006, it is an imprint of Elsevier.

== See also ==
- LexisNexis Butterworths
