= Pepi =

Pepi is the name of:

== People ==
Regnal name

- Pepi I Meryre, the third pharaoh of the Sixth dynasty of Egypt (2332–2282 BC)
- Pepi II Neferkare, the fifth pharaoh of the Sixth dynasty of Egypt (2284–2184 BC)
- Pepi III Neferirkare, last pharaoh of the Eighth dynasty of Egypt (2161–2160 BC)
- Pepi IV Seneferankhre, a pharaoh of the Sixteenth dynasty of Egypt

Given name

- Pepi Diaz, a Cuban-American attorney from Miami, Florida
- Pepi Lederer, an actress and writer

Surname

- Vincent Pepi, an abstract expressionist painter
- Ricardo Pepi, American soccer player
- Ryan and Kyle Pepi, twin child actors

Nickname

- Josef "Pepi" Bican, Czech footballer
- Pepi Erben, German alpine skier

Fiction

- Josefine “Pepi” Mutzenbacher, heroine of the eponymous Austrian novel from 1906

== Places ==
- Pepi Mountains, a former name of North Korea's Hamgyong Mountain Range
