= Quantum vortex =

Quantized flux circulation of some physical quantity

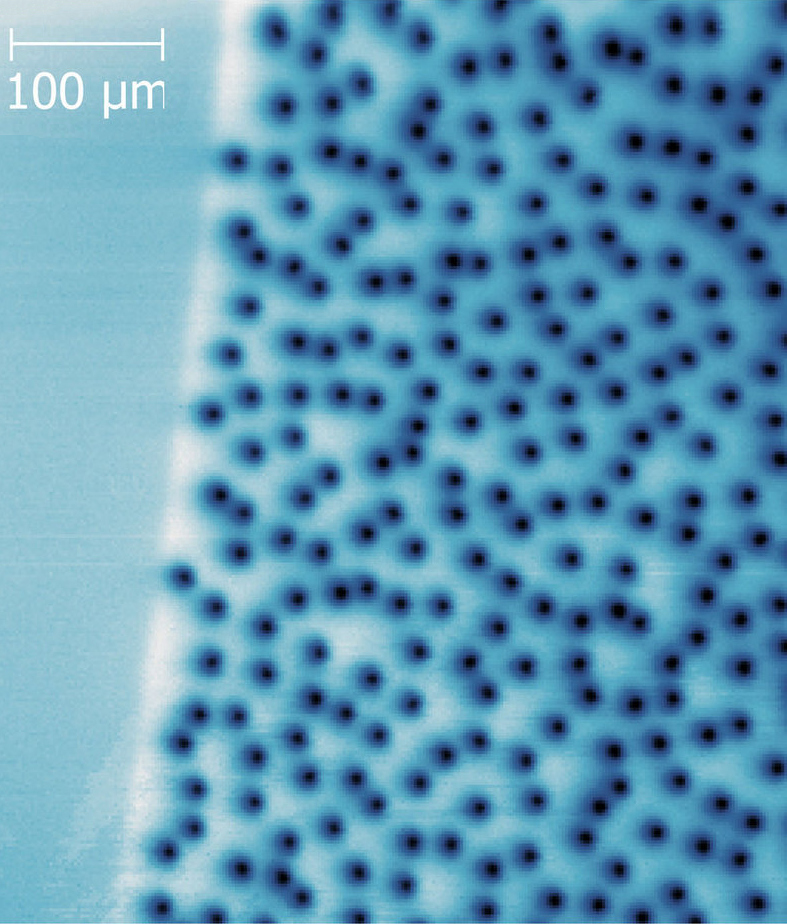
Vortices in a 200-nm-thick YBCO film imaged by scanning SQUID microscopy

In physics, a quantum vortex represents a quantized flux circulation of some physical quantity. In most cases, quantum vortices are a type of topological defect exhibited in superfluids and superconductors. The existence of quantum vortices was first predicted by Lars Onsager in 1949 in connection with superfluid helium. Onsager reasoned that quantisation of vorticity is a direct consequence of the existence of a superfluid order parameter as a spatially continuous wavefunction. Onsager also pointed out that quantum vortices describe the circulation of superfluid and conjectured that their excitations are responsible for superfluid phase transitions. These ideas of Onsager were further developed by Richard Feynman in 1955 and in 1957 were applied to describe the magnetic phase diagram of type-II superconductors by Alexei Alexeyevich Abrikosov. In 1935 Fritz London published a very closely related work on magnetic flux quantization in superconductors. London's fluxoid can also be viewed as a quantum vortex.

Quantum vortices are observed experimentally in type-II superconductors (the Abrikosov vortex), liquid helium, and atomic gases (see Bose–Einstein condensate), as well as in photon fields (optical vortex) and exciton-polariton superfluids.

In a superfluid, a quantum vortex "carries" quantized orbital angular momentum, thus allowing the superfluid to rotate; in a superconductor, the vortex carries quantized magnetic flux.

The term "quantum vortex" is also used in the study of few body problems. Under the de Broglie–Bohm theory, it is possible to derive a "velocity field" from the wave function. In this context, quantum vortices are zeros on the wave function, around which this velocity field has a solenoidal shape, similar to that of irrotational vortex on potential flows of traditional fluid dynamics.

== Vortex-quantisation in a superfluid ==
In a superfluid, a quantum vortex is a hole with the superfluid circulating around the vortex axis; the inside of the vortex may contain excited particles, air, vacuum, etc. The thickness of the vortex depends on a variety of factors; in liquid helium, the thickness is of the order of a few Angstroms.

A superfluid has the special property of having phase, given by the wavefunction, and the velocity of the superfluid is proportional to the gradient of the phase (in the parabolic mass approximation). The circulation around any closed loop in the superfluid is zero if the region enclosed is simply connected. The superfluid is deemed irrotational; however, if the enclosed region actually contains a smaller region with an absence of superfluid, for example a rod through the superfluid or a vortex, then the circulation is:

$$\oint_{C} \mathbf{v}\cdot\,d\mathbf{l} = \frac{\hbar}{m}\oint_{C}\nabla\phi_v\cdot\,d\mathbf{l} = \frac{\hbar}{m}\Delta^\text{tot}\phi_v,$$

where $\hbar$ is the Planck constant divided by $2\pi$, m is the mass of the superfluid particle, and $\Delta^\text{tot}\phi_v$ is the total phase difference around the vortex. Because the wave-function must return to its same value after an integer number of turns around the vortex (similar to what is described in the Bohr model), then $\Delta^\text{tot}\phi_v= 2\pi n$, where n is an integer. Thus, the circulation is quantized:

$$\oint_{C} \mathbf{v}\cdot\,d\mathbf{l} \equiv \frac{2\pi\hbar}{m} n \,.$$

== London's flux quantization in a superconductor ==
A principal property of superconductors is that they expel magnetic fields; this is called the Meissner effect. If the magnetic field becomes sufficiently strong it will, in some cases, "quench" the superconductive state by inducing a phase transition. In other cases, however, it will be energetically favorable for the superconductor to form a lattice of quantum vortices, which carry quantized magnetic flux through the superconductor. A superconductor that is capable of supporting vortex lattices is called a type-II superconductor, vortex-quantization in superconductors is general.

Over some enclosed area S, the magnetic flux is

$\Phi = \iint_S\mathbf{B}\cdot\mathbf{\hat{n}}\,d^2x = \oint_{\partial S}\mathbf{A}\cdot d\mathbf{l},$ where $\mathbf A$ is the vector potential of the magnetic induction $\mathbf B.$

Substituting a result of London's equation: $\mathbf{j}_s = -\frac{n_se_s^2}{m} \mathbf{A} + \frac{n_se_s\hbar}{m} \boldsymbol{\nabla}\phi$, we find (with $\mathbf B=\mathrm{curl}\,\, \mathbf A$):

$$\Phi =-\frac{m}{n_s e_s^2}\oint_{\partial S}\mathbf{j}_s\cdot d\mathbf{l} +\frac{\hbar}{e_s} \oint_{\partial S}\boldsymbol{\nabla}\phi\cdot d\mathbf{l},$$

where n_{s}, m, and e_{s} are, respectively, number density, mass, and charge of the Cooper pairs.

If the region, S, is large enough so that $\mathbf{j}_s = 0$ along $\partial S$, then

$$\Phi = \frac{\hbar}{e_s} \oint_{\partial S}\boldsymbol{\nabla}\phi\cdot d\mathbf{l} = \frac{\hbar}{e_s} \Delta^\text{tot}\phi = \frac{2\pi\hbar}{e_s}n.$$

The flow of current can cause vortices in a superconductor to move, causing the electric field due to the phenomenon of electromagnetic induction. This leads to energy dissipation and causes the material to display a small amount of electrical resistance while in the superconducting state.

== Constrained vortices in ferromagnets and antiferromagnets ==
The vortex states in ferromagnetic or antiferromagnetic material are also important, mainly for information technology. They are exceptional, since in contrast to superfluids or superconducting material one has a more subtle mathematics: instead of the usual equation of the type $\operatorname{curl} \ \vec v (x,y,z,t)\propto\vec \Omega (\mathrm r,t)\cdot\delta (x,y),$ where $\vec \Omega (\mathrm r,t)$ is the vorticity at the spatial and temporal coordinates, and where $\delta (x,y)$ is the Dirac function, one has:

$$\operatorname{curl} \, \vec v (x,y,z,t)\propto\vec m_\mathrm{eff} (\mathrm r,t)\cdot\delta(x,y) \ ,$$	*

where now at any point and at any time there is the constraint $m_x^2(\mathrm r, t)+m_y^2(\mathrm r,t)+m_z^2(\mathrm r,t)\equiv M_0^2$. Here $M_0$ is constant, the constant magnitude of the non-constant magnetization vector $\vec m(x,y,z,t)$. As a consequence the vector $\vec m$ in eqn. (*) has been modified to a more complex entity $\vec m_\mathrm{eff}$. This leads, among other points, to the following fact:

In ferromagnetic or antiferromagnetic material a vortex can be moved to generate bits for information storage and recognition, corresponding, e.g., to changes of the quantum number n. But although the magnetization has the usual azimuthal direction, and although one has vorticity quantization as in superfluids, as long as the circular integration lines surround the central axis at far enough perpendicular distance, this apparent vortex magnetization will change with the distance from an azimuthal direction to an upward or downward one, as soon as the vortex center is approached.

Thus, for each directional element $\mathrm d\varphi \,\mathrm d\vartheta$ there are now not two, but four bits to be stored by a change of vorticity: The first two bits concern the sense of rotation, clockwise or counterclockwise; the remaining bits three and four concern the polarization of the central singular line, which may be polarized up- or downwards. The change of rotation and/or polarization involves subtle topology.

== Statistical mechanics of vortex lines ==
As first discussed by Onsager and Feynman, if the temperature in a superfluid or a superconductor is raised, the vortex loops undergo a second-order phase transition. This happens when the configurational entropy overcomes the Boltzmann factor, which suppresses the thermal or heat generation of vortex lines. The lines form a condensate. Since the centre of the lines, the vortex cores, are normal liquid or normal conductors, respectively, the condensation transforms the superfluid or superconductor into the normal state. The ensembles of vortex lines and their phase transitions can be described efficiently by a gauge theory.

== Statistical mechanics of point vortices ==
In 1949 Onsager analysed a toy model consisting of a neutral system of point vortices confined to a finite area. He was able to show that, due to the properties of two-dimensional point vortices the bounded area (and consequently, bounded phase space), allows the system to exhibit negative temperatures. Onsager provided the first prediction that some isolated systems can exhibit negative Boltzmann temperature. Onsager's prediction was confirmed experimentally for a system of quantum vortices in a Bose-Einstein condensate in 2019.

== Pair-interactions of quantum vortices ==
In a nonlinear quantum fluid, the dynamics and configurations of the vortex cores can be studied in terms of effective vortex–vortex pair interactions. The effective intervortex potential is predicted to affect quantum phase transitions and giving rise to different few-vortex molecules and many-body vortex patterns. Preliminary experiments in the specific system of exciton-polaritons fluids showed an effective attractive–repulsive intervortex dynamics between two cowinding vortices, whose attractive component can be modulated by the nonlinearity amount in the fluid.

== Spontaneous vortices ==
Quantum vortices can form via the Kibble–Zurek mechanism. As a condensate forms by quench cooling, separate protocondensates form with independent phases. As these phase domains merge quantum vortices can be trapped in the emerging condensate order parameter. Spontaneous quantum vortices were observed in atomic Bose–Einstein condensates in 2008.

== See also ==
- Abrikosov vortex
- Bose–Einstein condensate
- Fractional vortices
- Josephson vortex
- Macroscopic quantum phenomena
- Negative temperature
- Optical vortex
- Quantum turbulence
- Superconductor
- Superfluid helium-4
- Superfluid film
- Type-1.5 superconductor
- Type-II superconductor
- Vortex
