= A. Douglas Stone =

American physicist

A. Douglas Stone is the Carl Morse Professor of Applied Physics and Physics at Yale University. He was the 2014 recipient of the Phi Beta Kappa Award in Science for his book Einstein and the Quantum: The Quest of the Valiant Swabian.

He has a Ph.D. in Physics from MIT, a social studies degree from Harvard and degrees in physics and philosophy from Oxford University. He was a Rhodes Scholar in 1976, An Alfred P. Sloan Fellow in 1990, an American Physical Society Fellow in 1993 and a fellow of the Optical Society of America in 2010.

== Awards ==
- Willis Lamb Medal in Laser Science (2015)
