= Polariton =

Quasiparticles arising from EM wave coupling

Dispersion relation of phonon polaritons in GaP. Red curves are the uncoupled phonon and photon dispersion relations, black curves are the result of coupling (from top to bottom: upper polariton, LO phonon, lower polariton).

Polariton represented as an exciton coupled to a Fabry-Perot cavity.

In physics, polaritons /pəˈlærɪtɒnz, poʊ-/ are bosonic quasiparticles resulting from strong coupling of electromagnetic waves (photon) with an electric or magnetic dipole-carrying excitation (state) of solid or liquid matter (such as a phonon, plasmon, or an exciton). Polaritons describe the crossing of the dispersion of light with any interacting resonance.

They are an expression of level repulsion (quantum phenomenon), also known as the avoided crossing principle. To this extent polaritons can be thought of as the new normal modes of a given material or structure arising from the strong coupling of the bare modes, which are the photon and the dipolar oscillation. Bosonic quasiparticles are distinct from polarons (fermionic quasiparticle), which is an electron plus an attached phonon cloud.

Polaritons violate the weak coupling limit and the associated photons do not propagate freely in crystals. Instead, propagation speed depends strongly on the frequency of the photon.

Significant experimental results on various aspects of exciton-polaritons have been gained in the case of copper(I) oxide.

== History ==
Oscillations in ionized gases were observed by Lewi Tonks and Irving Langmuir in 1929. Polaritons were first considered theoretically by Kirill Borisovich Tolpygo. They were termed light-excitons in Soviet scientific literature. That name was suggested by Solomon Isaakovich Pekar, but the term polariton, proposed by John Hopfield, was adopted.

Coupled states of electromagnetic waves and phonons in ionic crystals and their dispersion relation, now known as phonon polaritons, were obtained by Kirill Tolpygo in 1950 and independently by Huang Kun in 1951. Collective interactions were published by David Pines and David Bohm in 1952, and plasmons were described in silver by Herbert Fröhlich and H. Pelzer in 1955.

R.H. Ritchie predicted surface plasmons in 1957, then Ritchie and H.B. Eldridge published experiments and predictions of emitted photons from irradiated metal foils in 1962. Otto first published on surface plasmon-polaritons in 1968. Room-temperature superfluidity of polaritons was observed in 2016 by Giovanni Lerario et al., at CNR NANOTEC Institute of Nanotechnology, using an organic microcavity supporting stable Frenkel exciton-polaritons at room temperature.

In 2018, scientists reported the discovery of a new three-photon form of light, which may involve polaritons and could be useful in quantum computers.

In 2024 researchers reported ultrastrong coupling of the PEPI layer in a Fabry-Pérot microcavity consisting of two partially reflective mirrors. The PEPI layer is a two-dimensional perovskite made of (PEA)2PbI4 (phenethylammonium lead iodide). Placing a PEPI layer within a Fabry-Pérot microcavity forms polaritons and allows control of exciton-exciton annihilation, increasing solar cell efficiency and ED intensity.

== Types ==
A polariton is the result of the combination of a photon with a polar excitation in a material. The following are types of polaritons:

- Phonon polaritons result from coupling of an infrared photon with an optical phonon
- Exciton polaritons result from coupling of visible light with an exciton
- Intersubband polaritons result from coupling of an infrared or terahertz photon with an intersubband excitation
- Surface plasmon polaritons result from coupling of surface plasmons with light (the wavelength depends on the substance and its geometry)
- Bragg polaritons ("Braggoritons") result from coupling of Bragg photon modes with bulk excitons
- Plexcitons result from coupling plasmons with excitons
- Magnon polaritons result from coupling of magnon with light
- Pi-tons result from coupling of alternating charge or spin fluctuations with light, distinctly different from magnon or exciton polaritons
- Cavity polaritons

== See also ==
- Atomic coherence
- Polariton laser
- Polariton superfluid
- Polaritonics
