= Sandro Stringari =

Italian theoretical physicist (born 1949)

- Education: University of Pisa and Scuola Normale Superiore
- Scientific career
- Fields: Theoretical physics, Nuclear physics, and Ultracold atoms
- Workplaces: University of Trento
- Academic advisors: Bruno Touschek, Renzo Leonardi and David Brink

Sandro Stringari is an Italian theoretical physicist who has contributed to the theory of quantum many-body physics, including atomic nuclei, quantum liquids and ultra-cold atomic Bose and Fermi gases. He has developed in a systematic way the sum rule approach to the collective behavior of interacting systems.

== Biography ==
After the studies at the University of Pisa and at the Scuola Normale Superiore Pisa, completed in 1972 and supervised by Bruno Touschek, he moved to Trento and Oxford under the supervision of Renzo Leonardi and David Brink, respectively. In the years 1978/79 and 1985/86, invited by Oriol Bohigas Marti, he has worked at the Institut de Physique Nucleaire in Orsay. In 1990, he became full professor at the University of Trento, where he currently teaches an undergraduate course on quantum mechanics and a graduate course on quantum gases and superfluidity. In 2002, he established in Trento the Center on Bose –Einstein Condensation, founded by the Istituto Nazionale per la Fisica della Materia (INFM), and now part of CNR. In the year 2004/2005, invited by Claude Cohen-Tannoudji, he held the European Chair at the Collège de France, in Paris. In 2010, he was recipient of the 5 years ERC Advanced Grant "Quantum Gases beyond equilibrium". Since 2011, he is corresponding member of the Accademia Nazionale dei Lincei.

== Main scientific contributions ==
In the first period of his scientific career Sandro Stringari focused on the magnetic properties of atomic nuclei and on the isospin degree of freedom, developing the innovative sum rule approach to the collective excitations.

Starting from the 80’s he oriented his interests in the direction of atomic clusters and quantum liquids. Major contributions of this period are the study of the evaporation mechanism of helium clusters and the T=0 extension of the Hohenberg-Mermin-Wagner theorem.

His interests in the physics of Bose-Einstein condensates (BEC) started with the workshop on Bose-Einstein Condensation (BEC), known as the "Levico conference", organized in 1993 at Levico. After the first experimental realization of BEC in 1995, he developed the formalism of superfluid hydrodynamics to describe the collective oscillations of a harmonically trapped BECs, providing analytic predictions for their frequencies. This contribution had a major impact on the first generation of experiments on ultra cold quantum gases and influenced an important line of theoretical work. Later contributions to the dynamics of trapped quantum gases, and to their rotational, superfluid and thermodynamic properties are summarized in the review papers on Bose-Einstein condensates and Fermi gases as well as in the book on Bose-Einstein Condensation and Superfluidity written in collaboration with Lev Pitaevskii.
