= List of quasiparticles =

This is a list of quasiparticles and collective excitations used in condensed matter physics.

== List ==
Quasiparticles
Quasiparticle	Signification	Underlying particles
Amplitudon	A massive excitation representing a quantum of amplitude modulation, one of the modes present in charge density waves far below the critical temperature.	crystal lattice
Angulon	Used to describe the rotation of molecules in solvents. First postulated theoretically in 2015, the existence of the angulon was confirmed in February 2017, after a series of experiments spanning 20 years. Heavy and light species of molecules were found to rotate inside superfluid helium droplets, in good agreement with the angulon theory.	
Anyon	A type of quasiparticle that occurs only in two-dimensional systems, with properties much less restricted than fermions and bosons.	exciton
Biexciton	A bound state of two free excitons	
Bion	A bound state of solitons, named for Born–Infeld model	soliton
Bipolaron	A bound pair of two polarons	polaron
Bogolon	Broken Cooper pair	electron, hole
Composite fermion	Arise in a two-dimensional system subject to a large magnetic field, most famously those systems that exhibit the fractional quantum Hall effect.	electron
Configuron	An elementary configurational excitation in an amorphous material which involves breaking of a chemical bond	
Cooper pair	A bound pair of two electrons	electron
Dirac electron	Electrons in graphene behave as relativistic massless Dirac fermions	electron
Dislon	A localized collective excitation associated with a dislocation in crystalline solids. It emerges from the quantization of the lattice displacement field of a classical dislocation	
Doublon	Paired electrons in the same lattice site	electrons
Dropleton	The first known quasiparticle that behaves like a liquid	
Duon	Quasiparticle made of two particles coupled by hydrodynamic forces. These classical quasiparticles were observed as the elementary excitations in a 2D colloidal crystal driven by viscous flow.	
Electron quasiparticle	An electron as affected by the other forces and interactions in the solid	electron
Electron hole (hole)	A lack of electron in a valence band	crystal lattice
Exciton	A bound state of an electron and a hole (See also: biexciton)	electron, hole
Exciton-polariton	A bound state of an exciton and a photon.	photon, exciton
Ferron	A quasiparticle that carries heat and polarization, akin to phonon and magnons.	
Fracton	A collective quantized vibration on a substrate with a fractal structure.	
Fracton (subdimensional particle)	An emergent quasiparticle excitation that is immobile when in isolation.	
Helical Dirac fermion	Dirac electron with spin locked to its translational momentum.	Dirac electron
Holon (chargon)	A quasi-particle resulting from electron spin-charge separation	electron
Hopfion	A topological soliton. 3D counterpart of 2D magnetic skyrmion.	
Intersubband polariton	Dipolar allowed optical excitations between the quantized electronic energy levels within the conduction band of semiconductor heterostructures.	photon
Leviton	A collective excitation of a single electron within a metal	
Magnetic monopole	Arise in condensed matter systems such as spin ice and carry an effective magnetic charge as well as being endowed with other typical quasiparticle properties such as an effective mass.	
Magnetic skyrmion	Statically stable solitons which appear in magnetic materials. In 3D these are sometimes called hopfions.	
Magnon	A coherent excitation of electron spins in a material	
Majorana fermion	A quasiparticle equal to its own antiparticle, emerging as a midgap state in certain superconductors	
Nematicon	A soliton in nematic liquid-crystal media	
Orbiton	A quasiparticle resulting from electron spin–orbital separation	
Oscillon	A soliton-like single wave in vibrating media	
Pines' demon	Collective excitation of electrons which corresponds to electrons in different energy bands moving out of phase with each other. Named after David Pines	electrons
Phason	Vibrational modes in a quasicrystal associated with atomic rearrangements	crystal lattice
Phoniton	A theoretical quasiparticle which is a hybridization of a localized, long-living phonon and a matter excitation	phonon
Phonon	Vibrational modes in a crystal lattice associated with atomic shifts	crystal lattice
Phonon polariton	A coupling between phonon and photons.	optical phonon, photon
Plasmariton	Coupled optical phonon and dressed photon consisting of a plasmon and photon.	plasmon, photon
Plasmaron	A quasiparticle emerging from the coupling between a plasmon and a hole	plasmon, hole
Plasmon	A coherent excitation of a plasma	electron
Plexciton	Coupling plasmons with excitons	
Polaron	A moving charged quasiparticle that is surrounded by ions in a material	electron, phonon
Polariton	A mixture of photon with other quasiparticles	photon, optical phonon
Relaxon	A collective phonon excitation	Phonon
Rydberg polaron	Polarons in ensembles of Rydberg atoms and Bose–Einstein condensates.	Rydberg atom
Roton	Collective excitation associated with the rotation of a fluid (often a superfluid). It is a quantum of a vortex.	
Semi-Dirac electron	Particle with zero mass gap in one direction of space.	electron
Surface magnon polariton	Coupling between spin waves and electromagnetic waves.	magnon, photon
Surface phonon	Vibrational modes in a crystal lattice associated with atomic shifts at the surface.	
Surface plasmon	A coherent excitation of a plasma at the surface of a metal.	
Surface plasmon polariton	Coupling between surface plasmons and electromagnetic waves.	Surface plasmon, photon
Soliton	A self-reinforcing solitary excitation wave	
Spinon	A quasiparticle produced as a result of electron spin–charge separation that can form both quantum spin liquid and strongly correlated quantum spin liquid	
TI-polaron	Translational invariant polaron	polaron
Trion	A coherent excitation of three quasiparticles (two holes and one electron or two electrons and one hole)	electron, hole
Triplon	A quasiparticle formed from electrons with triplet state pairing	electron
Wrinklon	A localized excitation corresponding to wrinkles in a constrained two dimensional system	
Weyl electrons	In Weyl semimetals, electrons behave as massless, following the Weyl equation.	electron
Zeeman polariton	A coupling between paramagnetic spins and photons.	electron
