= Conf =

Conf may stand for:

- Configuration (disambiguation), a term with a number of meanings used in different fields.
- conf.exe, the filename of Microsoft NetMeeting
- Confessor of the faith, in the Christian Church; when the term Conf. follows the name of a Christian saint it denotes that the saint was a Confessor of the Faith.
