= Configuration =

Configuration or configurations may refer to:

== Computing ==
- Computer configuration or system configuration
- Configuration file, a software file used to configure the initial settings for a computer program
- Configurator, also known as choice board, design system, or co-design platform, used in product design to capture customers' specifications
- Configure script ("./configure" in Unix), the output of Autotools; used to detect system configuration
- CONFIG.SYS, the primary configuration file for DOS and OS/2 operating systems

== Mathematics ==
- Configuration (geometry), a finite set of points and lines with certain properties
- Configuration (polytope), special kind of configuration for regular polytopes
- Configuration space (mathematics), a space representing assignments of points to non-overlapping positions on a topological space

== Physics ==
- Configuration space (physics), in classical mechanics, the vector space formed by the parameters of a system
- Electron configuration, the distribution of electrons of an atom or molecule
- Molecular configuration, the permanent geometry that results from the spatial arrangement of molecular bonds
- Configuron, a quasiparticle

== History ==
- Historical configuration of the province of Granada

== Other uses ==
- Configuration (locomotive parts), denoting the number of leading, driving, and trailing axles on a locomotive
- Configuration management, a systems engineering quality control process
- Configurational analysis, a method of studying human behaviour.
- Configurations (journal), an academic journal established in 1993 by the Society for Literature, Science, and the Arts
