= Leviton (disambiguation) =

Leviton is an American manufacturer of electrical wiring equipment. Leviton may also refer to

- Leviton (quasiparticle), a collective excitation of a single electron within a metal
- Michael Leviton, American singer-songwriter and ukulele player
