= Tartarotti =

Tartarotti is a surname. Notable people with the surname include:

- Johannes Tartarotti
- Girolamo Tartarotti
