= Thomas Bensley =

Thomas Bensley (1759–1835) was an English printer known for fine work, and as a collaborator of Friedrich Koenig. He was an innovator in the fields of steam-powered printing presses, and lithography for book illustration.

== Life ==
Bensley, the son of a printer in The Strand, had printing premises at Bolt Court, off Fleet Street in London, and William Bulmer was considered his only rival in fine printing. In a preface Bensley complains of a fire which had destroyed his premises, with much of his stock; he was burned out on two separate occasions, in 1807 and 1819.

Works from the press included Thomas Macklin's folio Bible in seven volumes (1800), an edition of David Hume's History of England, and an octavo Shakespeare. A trustee of Providence Chapel, in Gray's Inn Lane, Bensley supported the ministry of William Huntington; and helped to raise the monument by Sir Richard Westmacott on the death of Huntington in 1813. He printed The Posthumous Letters of William Huntington (1822), which he also edited in part.

== Development of the press ==
Friedrich Koenig came to London from Saxony in 1806, with a design for the powered "Suhl press". Bensley took up the innovation, and formed a consortium with Richard Taylor and George Woodfall to monopolise it. Working with Andreas Friedrich Bauer, Koenig took out a patent in 1810, and built a working machine for Bensley in 1811. Over the next few years, development work produced a steam-driven press adapted to printing newspapers, rather than books as initially, and it was used for The Times of London. The working relationship of Bensley and Koenig broke down by 1817, however, as Bensley enforced his shareholding rights.
