= Wrinklon =

A wrinklon is a type of quasiparticle introduced in the study of wrinkling behavior in thin sheet materials, such as graphene or fabric. It is a localized excitation corresponding to wrinkles in a constrained two dimensional system.

It represents a localized region where two wrinkles in the material merge into one, serving as part of the pattern seen when the material forms wrinkles. The term "wrinklon" is derived from "wrinkle" and the suffix "-on", the latter commonly used in physics to denote quasiparticles such as the "phonon" or "polaron", as well as particles (photon, electron).

The concept of wrinklons aids in understanding and describing the complex wrinkling patterns observed in a variety of materials. This understanding could prove useful in fields such as material science and nanotechnology, particularly in the study and development of two-dimensional materials such as graphene.

Further studies have expanded the understanding of wrinklons, demonstrating that the behavior of these wrinkles in thin films, such as graphene, can differ depending on the substrate they are on. For instance, when graphene is on a compliant polymer substrate, the properties of the wrinklons change with the thickness of the graphene.

This suggests that the characteristics of the substrate have a significant role in wrinklon formation and behavior, which is important to take into account in various applications of thin-film materials.

== See also ==
- Straintronics
