= Maria Renata Saenger von Mossau =

Bavarian nun executed for witchcraft

Maria Renata Singer
- Born: 1680
- Died: June 1749 (aged 68–69)
- Occupation: Bavarian nun
- Years active: 1699–1749 (her death)
- Known for: executed for witchcraft

Maria Renata Singer or Saenger von Mossau (1680 – June 1749) was a Bavarian nun executed for heresy, witchcraft, apostasy and satanism, one of the last people executed for these charges in Germany and Europe.

== Life ==
Maria was inducted in the convent of Unterzell in the Prince-Bishopric of Würzburg in 1699, where she made herself known for her great piety and was appointed Sub Prioress in 1740. In 1746, one of the nuns, Cecilia, became afflicted with convulsions and claimed to be possessed by demons and poltergeists. The attacks spread through the convent and soon several nuns suffered from hysteric attacks. One of them died, after which Renata was pointed out as a satanist and a magician. The church then conducted an exorcism at the convent, during which the nuns rolled on the ground and "howled and snapped like mad cats." During a search in Renata's room, poisons, ointments, and strange robes were found. Renata confessed to a Benedictine confessor that she was a satanist and a witch; that in 1687, at the age of seven, she had sworn herself to Satan; at twelve, had become a prostitute and learned magic and to mix poisons; in 1694, Maria was baptized at a black mass; and in 1699, had entered the nunnery entirely to make strife amongst the "brides of Christ." She claimed to be a skilled chemist and preferred the poison Aqua Tofana developed by Giulia Tofana in Naples. She said she was remorseful, but the church still judged her guilty of sorcery, heresy, witchcraft, apostasy, and satanism, then turned her over to the secular authorities to be executed. She was beheaded and then burned in June 1749.

== Legacy ==
Sister Maria was an elderly member of the lower nobility and the holy orders, ensconced in a prominent cloister. Her trial for witchcraft and subsequent execution was a scandal throughout Germany and Northern Italy. The academic debates it occasioned—argued among Abbot Tartarotti, Scipione Maffei, Count Carli and others—eventually prompted the end of witchcraft as a legal matter.
