= Zell am Main =

Zell a.Main
- Municipality
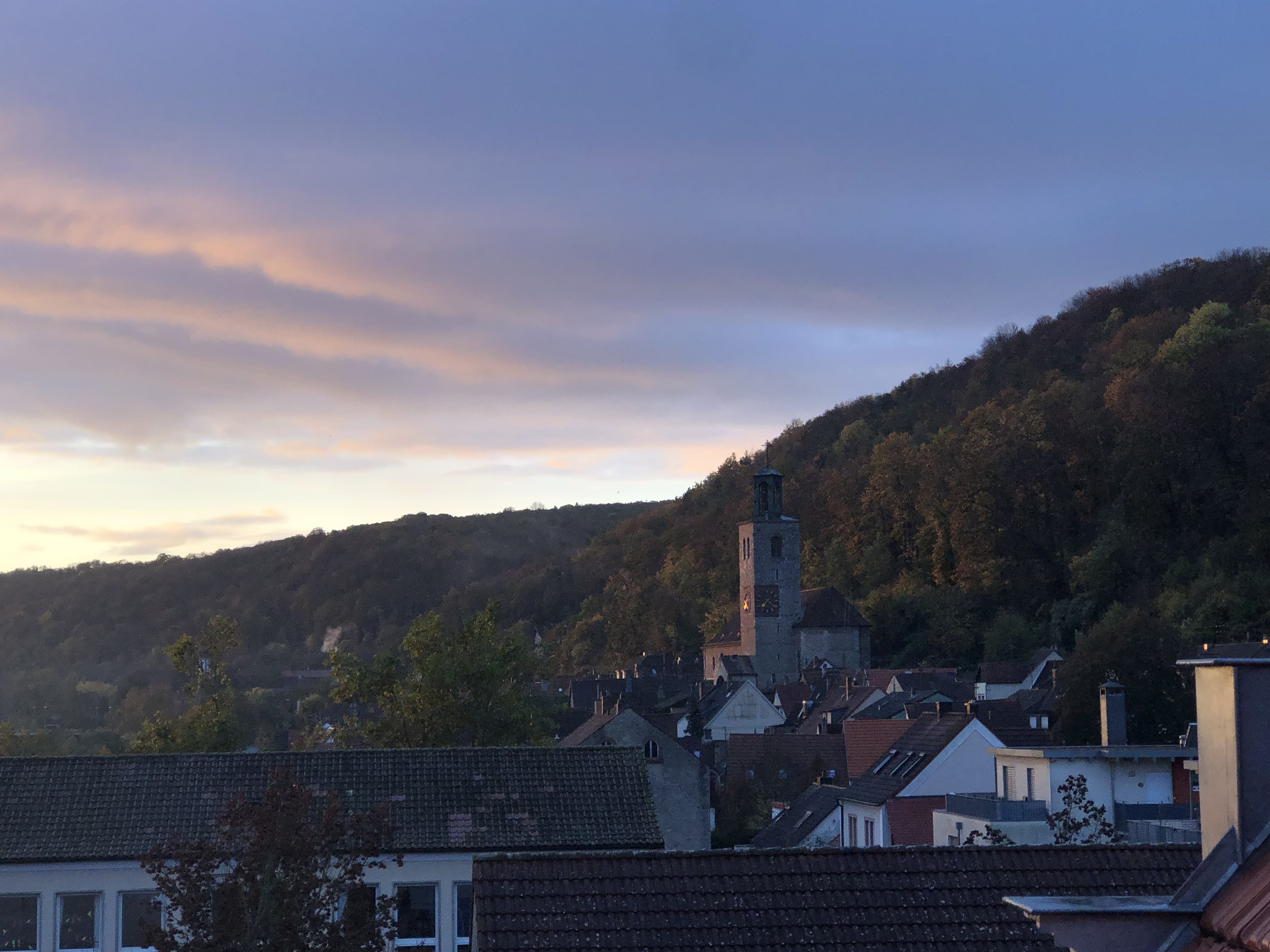
- View of the village from Unterzell Abbey

- Coat of arms

- Location of Zell a.Main within Würzburg district
- Interactive map of Zell a.Main
- Location within Germany Location within Bavaria
- Coordinates: 49°49′N 9°52′E
- Country: Germany
- State: Bavaria
- Admin. region: Unterfranken
- District: Würzburg

Government
  - Mayor (2020–26): Joachim Kipke

Area
  - Total: 9.95 km^{2} (3.84 sq mi)
- Elevation: 179 m (587 ft)

Population (2025-12-31)
  - Total: 4,346
  - Density: 437/km^{2} (1,130/sq mi)
- Time zone: UTC+01:00 (CET)
  - Summer (DST): UTC+02:00 (CEST)
- Postal codes: 97299
- Dialling codes: 0931
- Vehicle registration: WÜ
- Website: www.zell-main.de

Zell am Main (German pronunciation: [ˈtsɛl ʔam ˈmaɪn], lit. 'Zell on the Main') is a municipality in the district of Würzburg in Bavaria in Germany, situated on the river Main.

== History ==
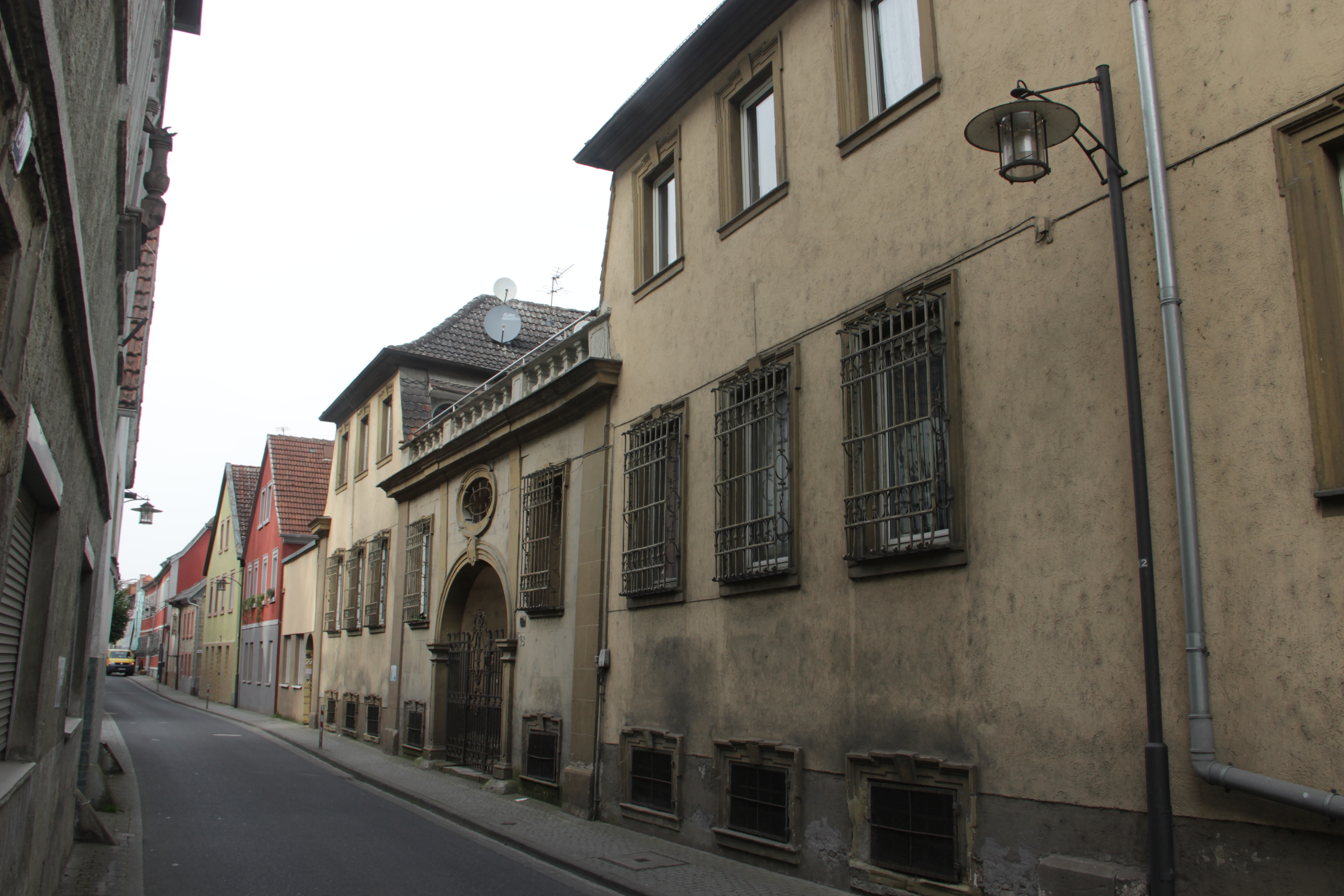
Zell's historic main street

The town of Zell was first mentioned as Cella in 1128, in relation to the still-extant Oberzell Abbey. The municipality's patron is St. Lawrence, who is also depicted in Zell's coat of arms, and to whom the Parish Church is dedicated. For much of its history, the town's main industry was winemaking. It attained market rights in 1833. The historic center of Zell houses several townhouses of wealthy wine merchants, including one designed by Balthasar Neumann.

The Premonstratensian monastery Oberzell was founded by Saint Norbert von Xanten (Archbishop of Magdeburg from 1126 to 1134) in 1126 and was consecrated to Saint Michael. According to legend, Norbert von Xanten had celebrated an Easter mass in Würzburg Cathedral when a blind woman who was there was seeing again. The municipality is also the site of Unterzell Abbey, founded in 1230. Both abbeys were secularised in the German mediatisation. Before being reconsecrated and restored by the Sisters of the Holy Childhood of Jesus in 1901, the secularised Oberzell Abbey, was Koenig & Bauer's first factory. Unterzell Abbey hosted Zell's small Jewish community, composed in the wake of the Hep-Hep riots of 1819 after which many yeshiva students and other Jews from Würzburg fled to the surrounding area, including to Rosenbaum in Theilheim. Rosenbaum and Bergmann, along with some of the Würzburg refugees, founded a new Jewish community in Unterzell, whose rabbi happened to have the surname Rosenbaum, and subsequently also a Talmud school. Today, a restored Sukkah on the Klosterhof commemorates the Jewish presence in Zell. The monastery church was ruined in World War II, while the remaining buildings have been converted to housing.

The historic center of Zell is laid out along a single narrow street between the Zeller Berg and the Main. It has become dilapidated as the town has expanded north in a suburban fashion since the postwar era. Recent developments include the restoration of Unterzell Abbey and the building of a new commercial center near the postwar-era Rathausplatz.

Subprioress Maria Renata Saenger von Mossau of Unterzell Abbey was burned at the stake for witchcraft in 1749, one of the last women in Europe to be executed on those charges.

== Notable people ==
- Andreas Friedrich Bauer
- Andreas Joseph Fahrmann
- Andreas Joseph Hofmann
- Abraham Rice
- Renata Singer
