= De La Rue =

Company based in Basingstoke, England

De La Rue plc
- Type: Private
- ISIN: GB00B3DGH821
- Industry: Printing
- Founded: 1821; 205 years ago
- Founder: Thomas de la Rue
- Headquarters: Basingstoke, Hampshire, England
- Key people: Clive Vacher (CEO); Clive Whiley (Chairman)
- Revenue: ▼£310.3 million (2024)
- Operating income: ▲£5.8 million (2024)
- Net income: ▲£(19.1) million (2024)
- Owner: Atlas Holdings
- Number of employees: 1,674 (2024)
- Website: www.delarue.com

De La Rue plc (UK: /ˈdɛləruː/, US: /ˌdɛləˈruː/) is a British company headquartered in Basingstoke, England that produces secure digital and physical protections for goods, trade and identities in 140 countries. It sells to governments, central banks, and businesses.

The company's main focus is currency, with the designing and production of banknotes, secure polymer substrate and banknote security features. This includes security holograms, security threads and security printed products for central banks and currency issuing authorities. It is the world's largest commercial printer of banknotes. De La Rue previously operated an authentication division in tandem with their currency focus, providing government revenue technology, brand protection, and ID security, before this division was merged into Crane NXT. Since July 2025, the company has been under private ownership by Atlas Holdings.

== History ==
The company was founded by Thomas de la Rue, who moved from Guernsey to London in 1821 and set up in business as a Leghorn straw hat maker, then as a stationer and printer. In 1831 he secured a Royal Warrant for his business to produce playing cards. In 1855 it started printing postage stamps and in 1860 banknotes. The company's first banknotes were made for Mauritius. In 1896, the family partnership was converted into a private company.

In 1921, the de la Rue family sold their interests. The company was first listed on the London Stock Exchange in 1947. Then called Thomas De La Rue & Company, Limited, it changed its name in 1958 to The De La Rue Company Limited. A takeover bid for De La Rue was made by the Rank Organisation in 1968, but this was rejected by the Monopolies commission as being against the public interest. In 1991 the company's name was changed again – this time to De La Rue plc.

In 1965 De La Rue established a joint venture with the Italian printer and inventor Gualtiero Giori called De La Rue Giori. Based in Switzerland, the company specialized in building banknote printing equipment. The company printed banknotes for the Central Bank of Iran during the 1960s.

In 1995, the company acquired Portals Limited which had been listed on the London stock market since 1904. For almost 300 years Portals had been one of the leading banknote paper manufacturers in the world, having manufactured banknote paper for the Bank of England since 1724.

In 1997, De La Rue acquired Harrison and Sons, the stamp and banknote printers based in High Wycombe. The factory closed permanently in 2003.

In early 2002, De La Rue purchased Sequoia Voting Systems, a California based company that was a large provider of electronic voting systems in the United States, from Jefferson Smurfit plc for $23 million.

Following the Panama Papers leak, it was revealed that from 2002 until 2010, De La Rue had secretly contracted New Delhi businessman Somendra Khosla to obtain contracts in exchange for a 15% commission.

In 2003, the company acquired the Debden based banknote printing operations of the Bank of England. In 2003 and 2004 the company supplied banknotes to Iraq.

The company was recognised by Hermann Simon as a role model for other small- to medium-sized businesses in his book Hidden Champions.

The Highest Perfection, a history of De La Rue was published in 2011. Written by Peter Pugh for De La Rue, it covered the years 1712–2003.

In August 2014, the company announced the appointment of Martin Sutherland (formerly of BAE Systems Applied Intelligence) as chief executive officer.

In 2016, the Cash Handling division (Cash Processing Systems) was sold to Privet Capital. In December, the firm announced it had purchased the DuPont Authentication division.

In March 2018, the company sold the paper business; De La Rue retained a 10% share in the new business, Portals International Limited. In April, it decided to appeal against the decision of the British government to manufacture passports in France. It subsequently decided against appealing.

In October 2019 the company sold its Identity Solutions business to HID Global for £42m.

On 26 July 2019, the Serious Fraud Office opened an investigation into De La Rue plc for suspected corruption in South Sudan. They later decided to close the case.

In April 2023, it was announced that chairman Kevin Loosemore was stepping down in May 2023 to "draw a line under recent speculation surrounding the leadership of the company". Following the launch of a fast-track search for a replacement, the company appointed Clive Wiley in May 2023.

In February 2024, it was announced that the company had been contracted, alongside the Bank of England, to design new bank notes carrying King Charles III's portrait. In October, the company agreed to sell its authentication business to Crane NXT for £300 million.

In April 2025, the company's board agreed a takeover by Atlas Holdings which valued the business at £263 million. The deal was completed on 3 July 2025, which resulted in the company delisting from the London Stock Exchange.

== Operations ==
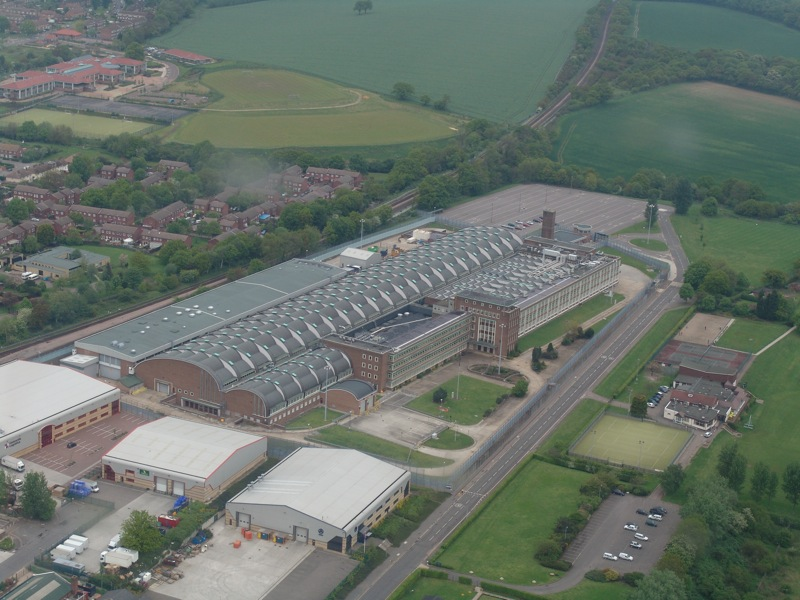
The Bank of England printing facility at Debden, operated under contract by De La Rue, which prints Bank of England banknotes.

=== Banknotes ===
De La Rue sells high-security fully finished banknotes, polymer substrate and security features for over 69 national currencies.

=== Security printing and papermaking ===
De La Rue also produces other secure documents, including tax stamps.

=== Corporate affairs ===
The company's board is chaired by Clive Wiley. Its non-executive board members are Nick Bray, Mark Hoad and Brian Small.

== Past products ==
=== Playing cards ===
In 1843, De La Rue's designs for playing cards are the basis for the modern standard design. The playing card business was sold to John Waddington in 1969.

=== Postage stamps ===
The company has also printed postage stamps for the United Kingdom and some of its colonies, for Italy and for the Confederate States of America. The Cape of Good Hope triangulars were also printed by De La Rue & Co.

=== Writing instruments ===
De La Rue developed the first practical fountain pen in 1881. Products were marketed under the "Onoto" brand. Production of fountain pens by De La Rue ceased in Britain in 1958 but continued for a few more years in Australia.

=== Board games ===
During the 1930s De La Rue created a number of board games. These included a cricket game, Stumpz, which was produced in a number of different editions, and Round The Horn, a game which re-created the then annual race of grain-laden, square-rigged sailing cargo ships from Australia to London.

=== Christmas cards ===
During the First World War, De La Rue made the Christmas card included in the Princess Mary Christmas gift box.

== Gallery of products produced by De La Rue ==
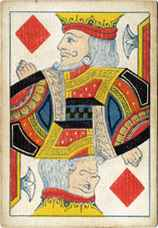
The King of Diamonds from a De La Rue pack c. 1860.

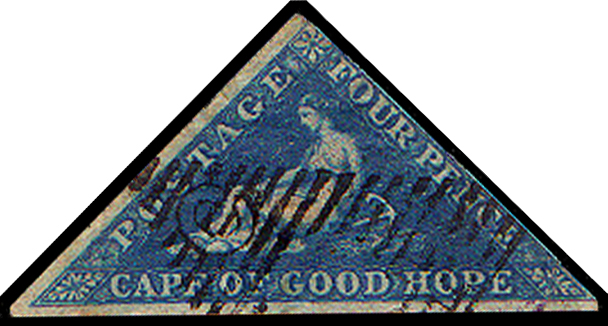
Cape of Good Hope triangular postage stamp of 1853.

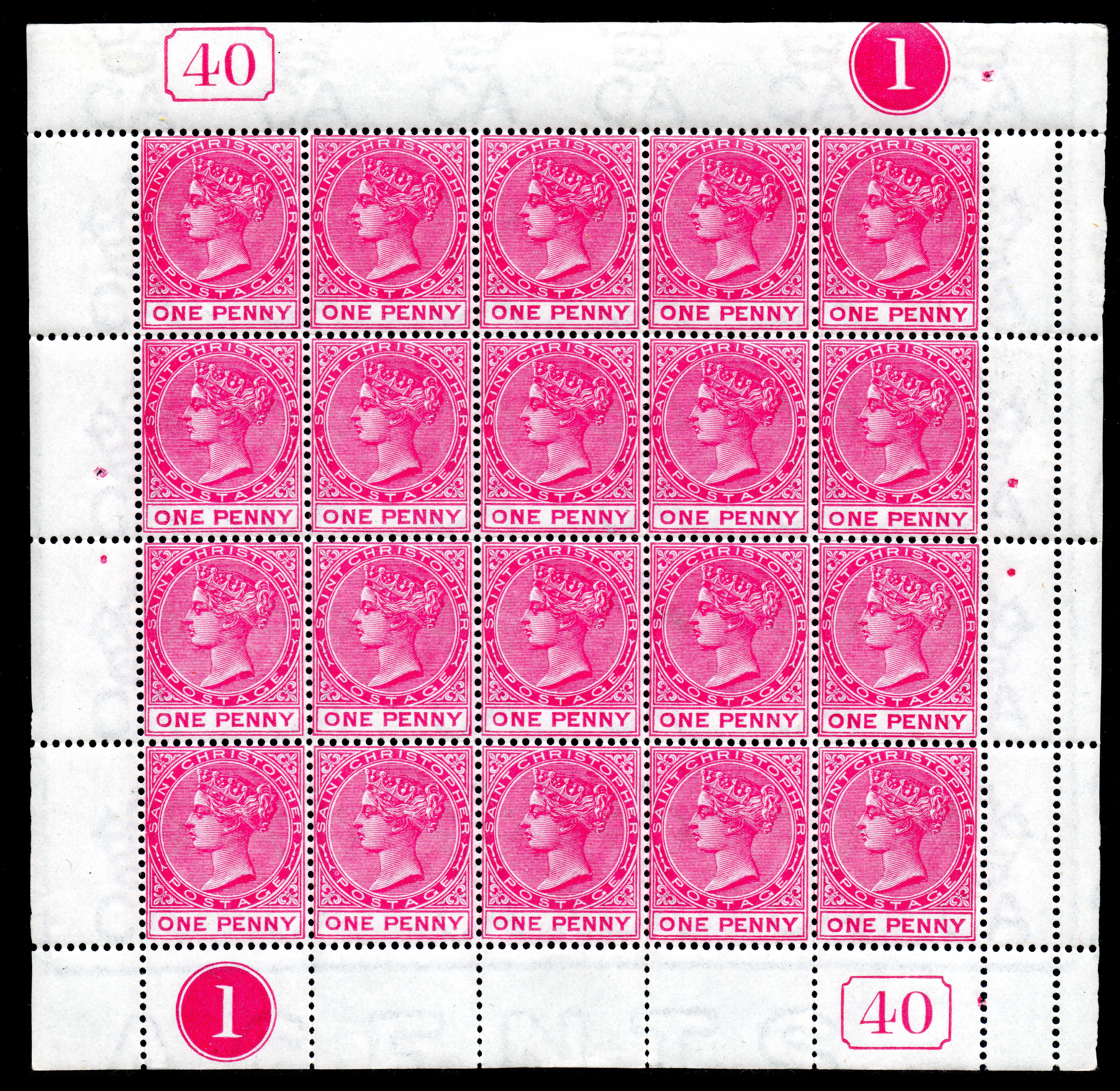
A sheet of stamps for St. Christopher, 1884.

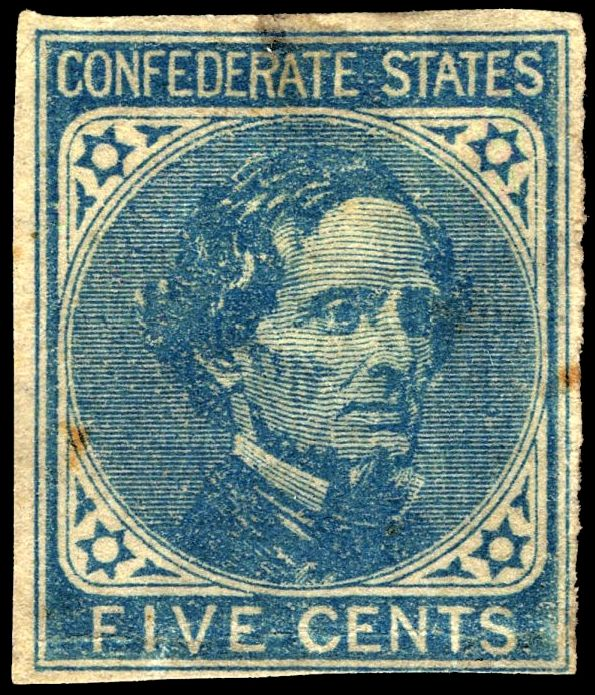
Confederate States of America postage stamp, 1862

== See also ==
- List of mints
- Banknotes of the pound sterling
- Commonwealth banknote-issuing institutions
- Gemalto – a competitor
- Giesecke & Devrient – a competitor based in Munich
- Hong Kong Note Printing – founded in 1984 by Thomas De La Rue
