= Friedrich Koenig =

German printer (1774–1833)

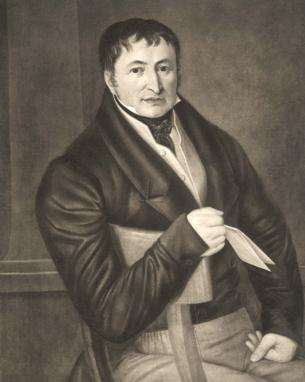
- Born: Friedrich Gottlob Koenig; 17 April 1774
- Died: 17 January 1833 (aged 58)
- Occupation: Inventor

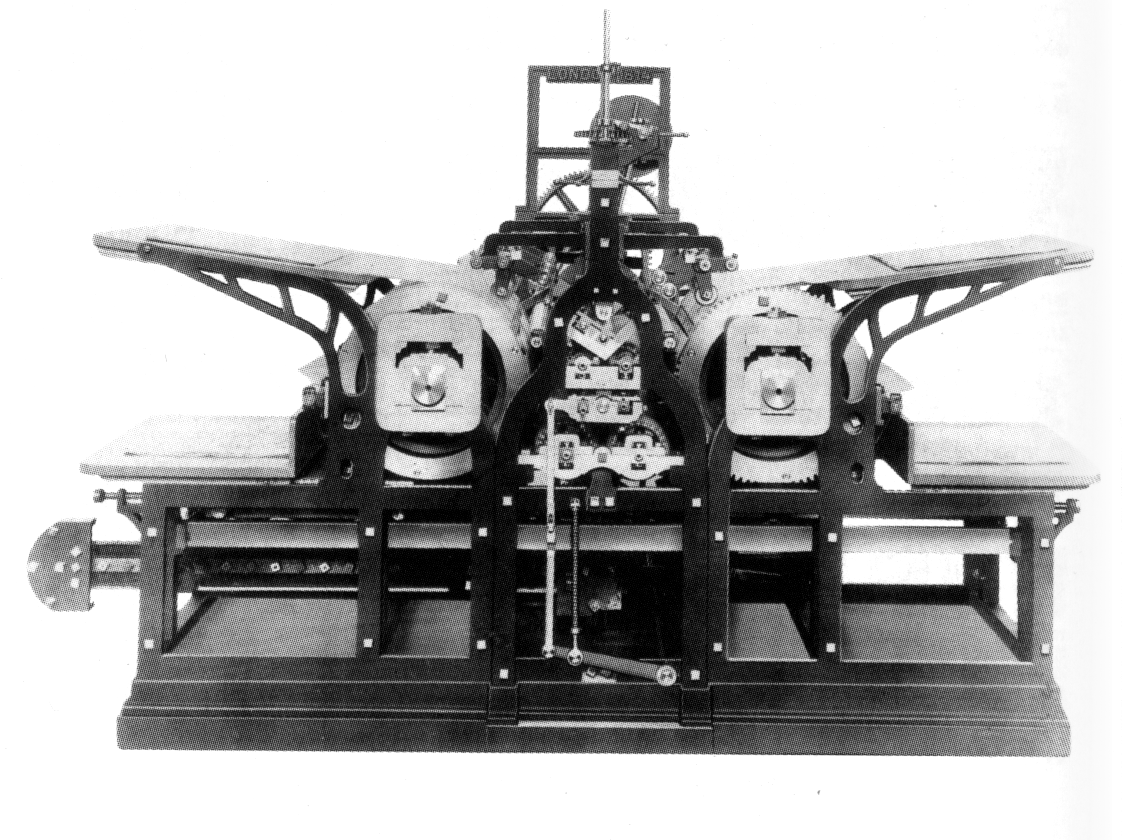
Koenig's 1814 steam-powered printing press

Friedrich Koenig (17 April 1774 – 17 January 1833) was a German inventor best known for his steam-powered printing press, which he built together with watchmaker Andreas Friedrich Bauer. This new style of printing press could initially print up to 1,100 single-sided impressions per hour. Koenig and Bauer later built another machine capable of "perfecting," or printing both sides of the paper on the same pass.

He moved to London in November 1806 and in 1810 was granted a patent on his press, which produced its first trial run in April 1812. The machine was set up in their workshop, and invitations sent out to potential customers, notably John Walter of The Times. Amidst much secrecy, for fear of upsetting the existing pressmen, trials were carried out with great success. The first issue of The Times printed with the new presses was published on 29 November 1814.

In August 1817 Koenig returned to Germany because of a disagreement with Thomas Bensley, a London book printer partner, who Koenig believed sought sole rights to the new machine. After consideration he chose an abandoned monastery in Würzburg for the premises of the factory. The firm was called Koenig & Bauer.

== Sources ==
- Bolza, Hans (1967), "Friedrich Koenig und die Erfindung der Druckmaschine", Technikgeschichte, 34 (1): 79–89
- Wolf, Hans-Jürgen (1974), Geschichte der Druckpressen (1st ed.), Frankfurt/Main: Interprint
