= Davydov soliton =

Quasiparticle used to model vibrations within proteins

Quantum dynamics of a Davydov soliton with $\chi = 35$ pN generated by an initial Gaussian step distribution of amide I energy over 3 peptide groups at the N-end of a single α-helix spine composed of 40 peptide groups (extending along the x-axis) during a period of 125 picoseconds. Quantum probabilities $|a_n|^2$ of amide I excitation are plotted in blue along the z-axis. Phonon lattice displacement differences $b_n-b_{n-1}$ (measured in picometers) are plotted in red along the y-axis. The soliton is formed by self-trapping of the amide I energy by the induced lattice distortion.

In quantum biology, the Davydov soliton (after the Soviet Ukrainian physicist Alexander Davydov) is a quasiparticle representing an excitation propagating along the self-trapped amide I groups within the α-helices of proteins. It is a solution of the Davydov Hamiltonian.

The Davydov model describes the interaction of the amide I vibrations with the hydrogen bonds that stabilize the α-helices of proteins. The elementary excitations within the α-helix are given by the phonons which correspond to the deformational oscillations of the lattice, and the excitons which describe the internal amide I excitations of the peptide groups. Referring to the atomic structure of an α-helix region of protein the mechanism that creates the Davydov soliton (polaron, exciton) can be described as follows: vibrational energy of the C=O stretching (or amide I) oscillators that is localized on the α-helix acts through a phonon coupling effect to distort the structure of the α-helix, while the helical distortion reacts again through phonon coupling to trap the amide I oscillation energy and prevent its dispersion. This effect is called self-localization or self-trapping. Solitons in which the energy is distributed in a fashion preserving the helical symmetry are dynamically unstable, and such symmetrical solitons once formed decay rapidly when they propagate. On the other hand, an asymmetric soliton which spontaneously breaks the local translational and helical symmetries possesses the lowest energy and is a robust localized entity.

== Davydov Hamiltonian ==
Davydov Hamiltonian is formally similar to the Fröhlich-Holstein Hamiltonian for the interaction of electrons with a polarizable lattice. Thus the Hamiltonian of the energy operator $\hat{H}$ is

$$\hat{H}=\hat{H}_{\text{ex}}+\hat{H}_{\text{ph}}+\hat{H}_{\text{int}}$$

where $\hat{H}_{\text{ex}}$ is the exciton Hamiltonian, which describes the motion of the amide I excitations between adjacent sites; $\hat{H}_{\text{ph}}$ is the phonon Hamiltonian, which describes the vibrations of the lattice; and $\hat{H}_{\text{int}}$ is the interaction Hamiltonian, which describes the interaction of the amide I excitation with the lattice.

The exciton Hamiltonian $\hat{H}_{\text{ex}}$ is

$$\begin{align}
\hat{H}_{\text{ex}} =& \sum_{n,\alpha}E_{0}\hat{A}_{n,\alpha}^{\dagger}\hat{A}_{n,\alpha} \\
&-J_1\sum_{n,\alpha}\left(\hat{A}_{n,\alpha}^{\dagger}\hat{A}_{n+1,\alpha}+\hat{A}_{n,\alpha}^{\dagger}\hat{A}_{n-1,\alpha}\right) \\
&+J_2\sum_{n,\alpha}\left(\hat{A}_{n,\alpha}^{\dagger}\hat{A}_{n,\alpha+1}+\hat{A}_{n,\alpha}^{\dagger}\hat{A}_{n,\alpha-1}\right)
\end{align}$$

where the index $n=1,2,\cdots,N$ counts the peptide groups along the α-helix spine, the index $\alpha=1,2,3$ counts each α-helix spine, $E_{0}=32.8$ zJ is the energy of the amide I vibration (CO stretching), $J_1=0.155$ zJ is the dipole-dipole coupling energy between a particular amide I bond and those ahead and behind along the same spine, $J_2=0.246$ zJ is the dipole-dipole coupling energy between a particular amide I bond and those on adjacent spines in the same unit cell of the protein α-helix, $\hat{A}_{n,\alpha}^{\dagger}$ and $\hat{A}_{n,\alpha}$ are respectively the boson creation and annihilation operator for an amide I exciton at the peptide group $(n,\alpha)$.

The phonon Hamiltonian $\hat{H}_{\text{ph}}$ is

$$\hat{H}_{\text{ph}}=\frac{1}{2}\sum_{n,\alpha}\left[w_1(\hat{u}_{n+1,\alpha}-\hat{u}_{n,\alpha})^{2}+w_2(\hat{u}_{n,\alpha+1}-\hat{u}_{n,\alpha})^{2}+\frac{\hat{p}_{n,\alpha}^{2}}{M_{n,\alpha}}\right]$$

where $\hat{u}_{n,\alpha}$ is the displacement operator from the equilibrium position of the peptide group $(n,\alpha)$, $\hat{p}_{n,\alpha}$ is the momentum operator of the peptide group $(n,\alpha)$, $M_{n,\alpha}$ is the mass of the peptide group $(n,\alpha)$, $w_1=13-19.5$ N/m is an effective elasticity coefficient of the lattice (the spring constant of a hydrogen bond) and $w_2=30.5$ N/m is the lateral coupling between the spines.

Finally, the interaction Hamiltonian $\hat{H}_{\text{int}}$ is

$$\hat{H}_{\text{int}}=\chi\sum_{n,\alpha}\left[(\hat{u}_{n+1,\alpha}-\hat{u}_{n,\alpha})\hat{A}_{n,\alpha}^{\dagger}\hat{A}_{n,\alpha}\right]$$

where $\chi=35-62$ pN is an anharmonic parameter arising from the coupling between the exciton and the lattice displacements (phonon) and parameterizes the strength of the exciton-phonon interaction. The value of this parameter for α-helix has been determined via comparison of the theoretically calculated absorption line shapes with the experimentally measured ones.

== Properties ==
There are three possible fundamental approaches for deriving equations of motion from Davydov Hamiltonian:

- quantum approach, in which both the amide I vibration (excitons) and the lattice site motion (phonons) are treated quantum mechanically;
- mixed quantum-classical approach, in which the amide I vibration is treated quantum mechanically but the lattice is classical;
- classical approach, in which both the amide I and the lattice motions are treated classically.

The mathematical techniques that are used to analyze the Davydov soliton are similar to some that have been developed in polaron theory. In this context, the Davydov soliton corresponds to a polaron that is:

- large so the continuum limit approximation is justified,
- acoustic because the self-localization arises from interactions with acoustic modes of the lattice,
- weakly coupled because the anharmonic energy is small compared with the phonon bandwidth.

The Davydov soliton is a quantum quasiparticle and it obeys Heisenberg's uncertainty principle. Thus any model that does not impose translational invariance is flawed by construction. Supposing that the Davydov soliton is localized to 5 turns of the α-helix results in significant uncertainty in the velocity of the soliton $\Delta v=133$ m/s, a fact that is obscured if one models the Davydov soliton as a classical object.
