= Dislon =

A dislon is a quantized field associated with the quantization of the lattice displacement in crystalline solids. It is a localized collective excitation of a crystal dislocation.

== Description ==
Dislons are special quasiparticles that emerge from the quantization of the lattice displacement field around a dislocation in a crystal. They exhibit unique particle statistics depending on the dimension of quantization. In one-dimensional quantization, dislons behave as bosonic quasiparticles. However, in three-dimensional quantization, the topological constraint of the dislocation leads to a breakdown of the canonical commutation relation, resulting in the emergence of two independent bosonic fields known as the d-field and f-field.

== Interaction ==
Dislons interact with other particles such as electrons and phonons. In the presence of multiple dislocations, the electron-dislon interaction can affect the electrical conductivity of the system. The distance-dependent interaction between electrons and dislocations leads to oscillations in the electron self-energy away from the dislocation core.

== Applications ==
The study of dislons provides insights into various phenomena in materials science, including the variation of superconducting transition temperatures in dislocated crystals. Dislons play a role in understanding the interaction between dislocations and phonons, affecting thermal transport properties in the presence of dislocations.

== See also ==
- Quasiparticle
- Special theory of relativity
- List of particles
- List of quasiparticles
- Strong interaction
