= Gualtiero Giori =

Italian security printer

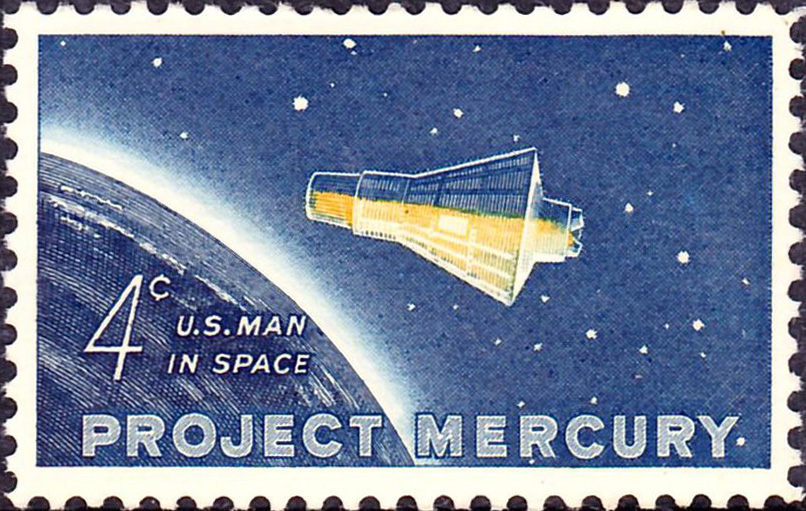
The Project Mercury stamp of 1962, one of the first US postage stamps printed on a Giori Press.

Gualtiero "Rino" Giori (1913–1992) was an Italian security printer and inventor who founded the company Giori SA in 1951.

== Life ==
Giori came from a family of security printers. In 1876, his grandfather purchased a printing company in Milan, which later developed into a supplier of documents such as share certificates and cheques.

In the 1930s, Giori worked as an intaglio printer, salesman, and inventor. After World War II, he offered a then-new concept in multicolour intaglio printing combined with a liquid wiping system. By 1947, Giori had developed the first six-colour intaglio printing press, designed to print banknotes which combined more artistic possibilities with greater security features. In 1949, some of his new machines were sold to the Argentinian security printer Casa de la Moneda. In 1951, Giori founded his own security printing company, Giori SA. In 1952, the next year he entered into a collaborative agreement with Koenig & Bauer to print banknotes and security documents, which developed into a longer-term partnership that would come six years later. The terms of the 1952 agreement were highly favorable to Giori, which showed Koenig & Bauer’s concern over Giori’s advancements and the risk of losing business. Initially, Koenig & Bauer gave Giori all distribution rights, as well as all patent rights for the new Giori machines they planned to produce together. In return, Koenig held exclusive manufacturing rights for these machines.

Giori managed his finances much better than Koenig & Bauer. He informally lent large sums and gradually became a major shareholder in the company.

Later in the 1950s, Giori launched the Simultan offset press, capable of printing three-line images in three different colors with a single pass over the printing surface.

In 1965 Giori established a joint venture with De La Rue called De La Rue Giori. Based in Switzerland, it specialized in building banknote printing equipment.

In 2001 Giori SA was acquired by Koenig & Bauer, part of which was renamed KBA Giori.

== Private life ==
He was a very generous and proud man who loved beautiful things and women. He was married more than three times but the following are his recognized marriages: first to Mariuccia, mother of his daughter Daniela and son Roberto, next to the actress Rossella Falk, and finally to Marina Swarovski. He married Falk in 1976, but they divorced in 1980. He has various grandchildren but the ones who have shared part of his life and experiences are Andrea and Elena, Daniela's children, his eldest daughter.
