= Koenig & Bauer =

German manufacturer of printing presses

Koenig & Bauer AG
- Company type: Aktiengesellschaft
- Traded as: FWB: SKB
- Industry: Printing press Manufacturing
- Predecessor: Albert-Frankenthal; Planeta Druckmaschinenwerk
- Founded: 1817
- Founder: Friedrich Koenig and Andreas Bauer
- Headquarters: Würzburg, Germany
- Area served: Worldwide
- Key people: Andreas Pleßke (CEO)
- Products: Printing presses
- Revenue: 1,115.8 million EUR (2021)
- Number of employees: 5,397 (2021)
- Website: koenig-bauer.com

history of Koenig & Bauer

Koenig & Bauer AG (; FWB: SKB) is a German company that makes printing presses based in Würzburg. It was founded by Friedrich Koenig and Andreas Friedrich Bauer in Würzburg in 1817, making it the oldest printing press manufacturer in the world still in service.

95% of the banknotes used in the world are printed on printers made by Koenig & Bauer Banknote Solutions SA, a division of Koenig & Bauer.

== History ==
Founded in 1817, by the 20th century Koenig and Bauer had become a major company and the world's leading manufacturer of security printing equipment.

In 1951, the firm began to suffer from the age of the designs of the machines it was selling, some of which dated from the early 1920s, and its chairman, Hans Bolza, faced up to the need to come to terms with Gualtiero Giori, an Italian printer and inventor with a company in Lausanne who had made great advances in intaglio printing. Bolza established an immediate rapport with Giori, and the deal they signed in 1952 led to a long-term agreement in 1958. Koenig & Bauer surrendered to Giori its distribution rights, even in Germany, but gained the exclusive rights to manufacture Giori machines, and the two had a long and profitable association. In 2001, after Giori's death, Koenig & Bauer acquired his company, Giori SA, part of which was renamed KBA Giori

=== Printing capacity ===
The table lists the maximum number of pages which the various early 19th-century press designs of Friedrich Koenig and Andreas Bauer could print per hour, compared to earlier hand-operated screw presses. The table includes those designs which were constructed by the pair in England before the establishment of their company upon their return to Germany.

	Hand-operated presses		Steam-powered presses			
	Gutenberg-style ca. 1600	Stanhope ca. 1800	Koenig & Bauer 1812	Koenig & Bauer 1813	Koenig & Bauer 1814	Koenig & Bauer 1818
Impressions per hour	240	480	800	1100	2000	2400
