= Girolamo Tartarotti =

Italian abbot, Neo-Platonist, and writer

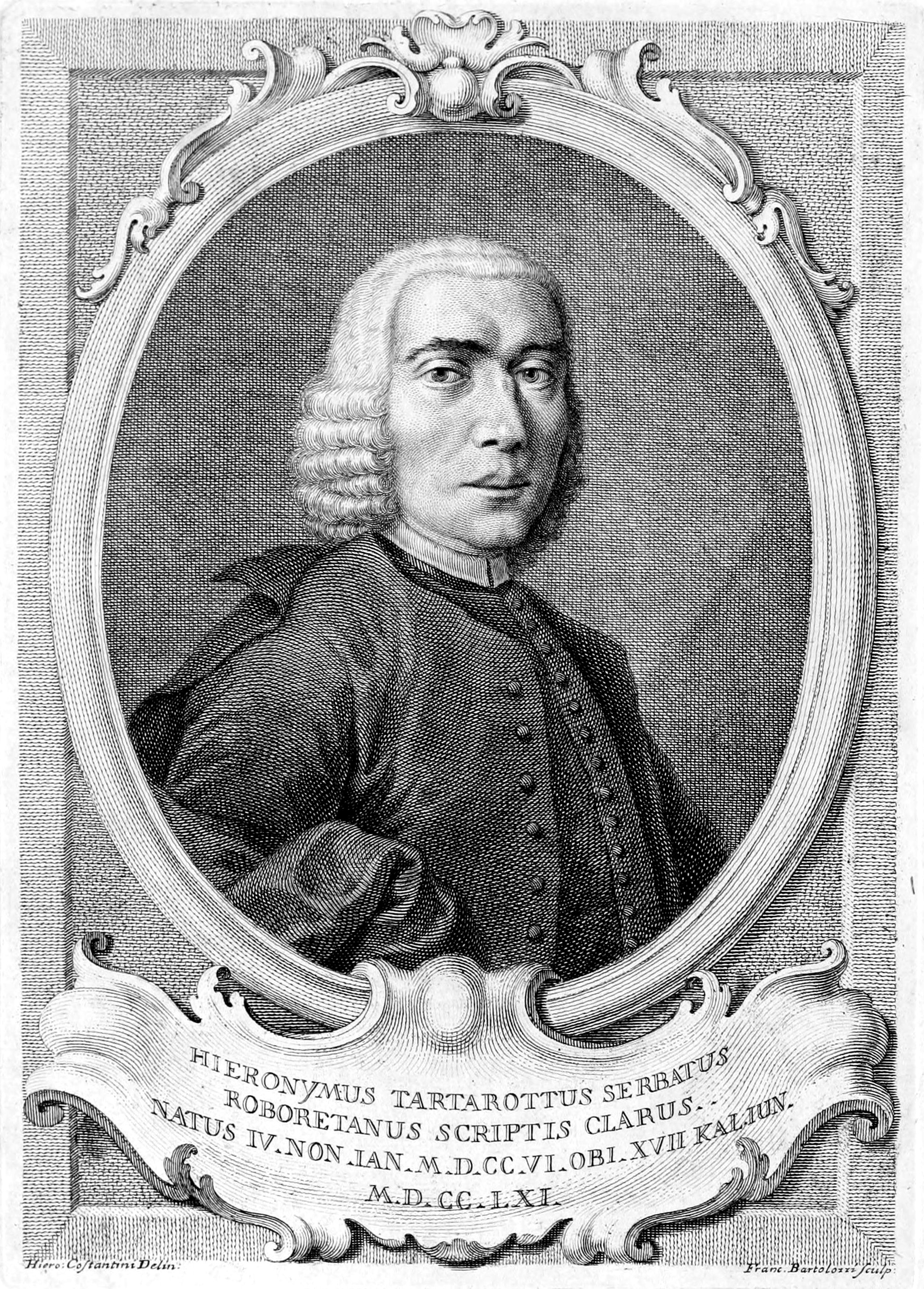
Girolamo Tartarotti

Girolamo Tartarotti (Latin: Hieronymous Tartarotti; 1706–1761) was an Italian abbot, Neo-Platonist, and writer, primarily famed for his works on witchcraft.

== Life ==
Tartarotti was born at Rovereto near Trent and studied at the University of Padua. For a time, he formed part of the entourage of Marco Foscarini, who later served as doge of Venice.

Following the execution of the elderly nun Maria Renata Singer on charges of witchcraft, he took part in the academic debate over the witchcraft trials of his time, attempting to strike a middle ground which—against Martin Delrio and Benedetto Bonelli—dismissed most purported claims of witchcraft while, on the grounds of its appearance in scripture, upholding the existence of sorcery against the skepticism of Scipione Maffei and Count Carli. The equivocation such a position entailed was first refuted by Bonelli in 1751.

== Works ==
Abbot Tartarotti's Three Books on the Nocturnal Congress of the Lamia—composed in 1748 but delayed from publication by the Venetian Inquisition until 1750—proposed that witchcraft was an organized religion descended from the Romans' cults of Diana and Erodiade. This was an unpopular and heterodox idea, (Note: Church doctrine at the time taught that witches were worshippers of the Devil rather than any goddess.) and he was obliged to restate some points in an apologia two years later. He had the sermons of the Jesuit Georg Gaar, one of the clerics responsible for Sister Maria's execution, translated into Italian so as to publish his own attacks against the man's points. He defended the existence of witchcraft, however, and won the vast majority of Italian academics to his side of the debate.

- Ragionamento intorno alla poesia lirica toscana (1728)
- Idea della logica degli scolastici e dei moderni (1731)
- Delle disfide letterarie, o sia pubbliche difese di conclusioni (1735)
- De origine Ecclesiae tridentinae et primis eius episcopis (1743)
- Memorie istoriche intorno alla vita e morte de' santi Sisinio, Martirio ed Alessandro (1745)
- De versione Rufiniana Historiae ecclesiasticae Eusebii Caesariensis dissertatio, in qua Valesianae interpretationis dignitas et praestantia vindicatur (1748)
- Del Congresso Notturno delle Lammie Libri Tre, Venice: Giambatista Pasquali, 1749. (in Italian)
- De auctoribus ab Andrea Dandulo laudatis in Chronico Veneto (1751)
- Apologia del Congresso Notturno delle Lammie, o Sia Riposta all'Arte Magica Dileguata di S. Maffei ed all'Opposizione di B. Melchiori, Venice, 1751. (in Italian)
- Lettera di un giornalista d'Italia ad un giornalista oltramontano sopra il libro intitolato: Vindiciae Romani Martyrologii uscito in Verona (1751)
- Memorie antiche di Rovereto e dei luoghi circonvicini (1754)
- Apologia delle Memorie antiche di Rovereto (1758)
- Dell'origine della Chiesa di Aquileia (1759)
- Lettera seconda di un giornalista d'Italia ad un giornalista oltramontano sopra il libro intitolato: Notizie istorico-critiche intorno al b.m. Adalpreto Vescovo di Trento (1760)

Published in Raccolta d'opuscoli scientifici e filologici edited by Angelo Calogerà:

- Relazione d'un manoscritto dell'Istoria manoscritta di Giovanni Diacono veronese (1738)
- Dissertazione intorno all'arte critica (1740)
- Lettera intorno all'Eloquenza italiana di mons. Fontanini (1741)
- Lettera al sig. N.N. intorno alla sua tragedia intitolata il Costantino (1741)
- Lettera intorno a detti o sentenze attribuite ad autori di cui non sono (1741)
- Lettera intorno alla differenza delle voci nella lingua italiana (1745)
- Lettera intorno ad una particolare significazione degli avverbi fere e quasi nelle lingue italiana e latina (1748)

Published posthumously:

- Osservazioni sopra la Sofonisba del Trissino con prefazione del cav. Clementino Vannetti (1784)
- Rime scelte dall'abate Girolamo Tartarotti (1785)
- La conclusione dei frati francescani riformati (1785)
- Dialoghi della lingua latina
- Annotazioni al Dialogo delle false esercitazioni delle scuole d'Aonio Paleario (1795)

== Legacy ==
Leo Martello revived the concept of witchcraft (specifically the Italian Stregheria) as a survival of the cult of Diana in the 1970s.
