= Gian Rinaldo Carli =

Venetian economist, historian, and antiquarian

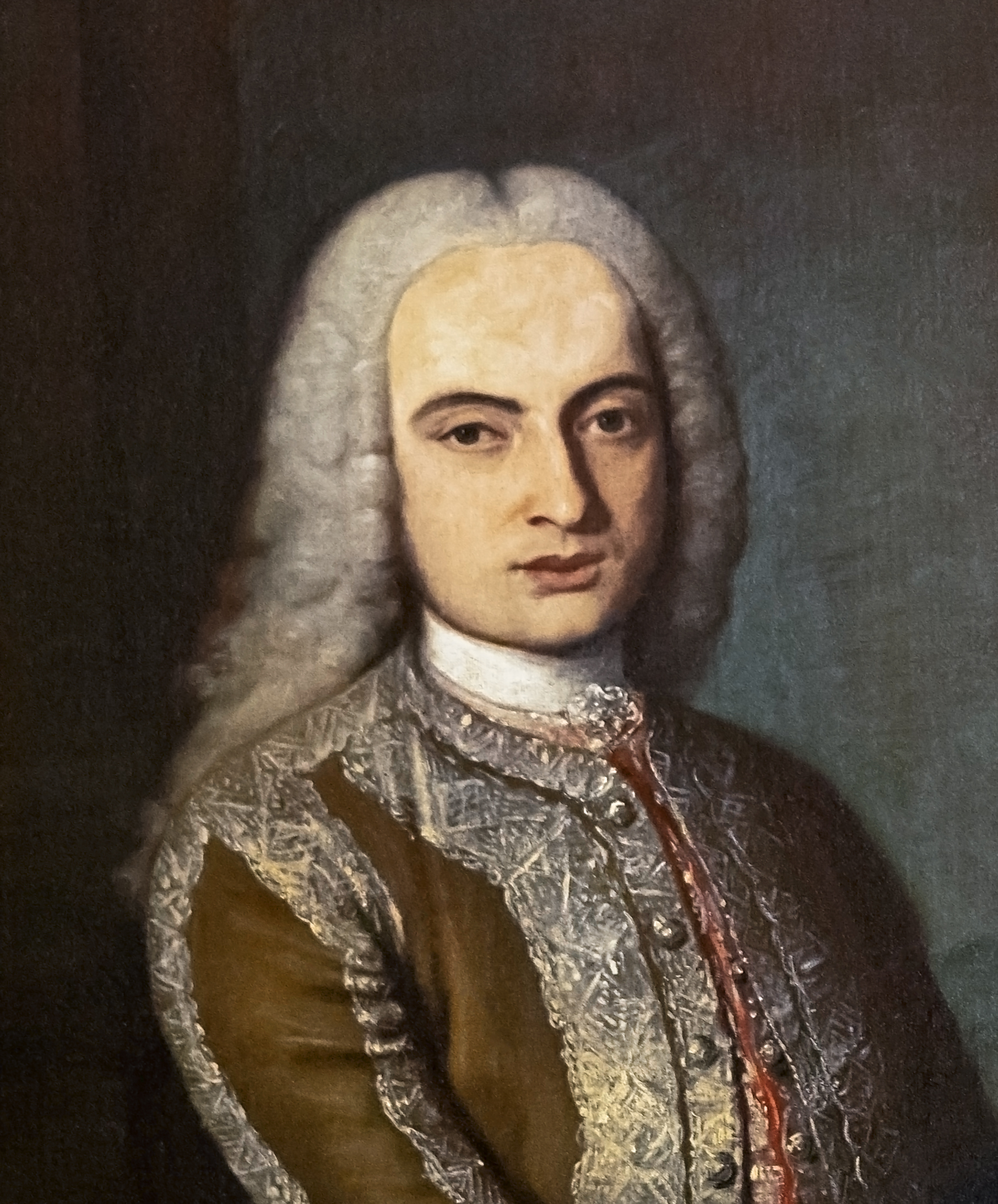
- Born: 11 April 1720; Capo d'Istria in the Republic of Venice (now Koper in Slovenia)
- Died: 22 February 1795 (aged 74); Cusano in Milan
- Occupations: economist, historian, and antiquarian

Gian Rinaldo Carli (11 April 1720 – 22 February 1795), also known by other names, was a Venetian economist, historian, and antiquarian.

== Name ==
"Gian Rinaldo Carli" is the modern Italian form of his name, which may also appear as "Gianrinaldo Carli" or "Gian-Rinaldo Carli". His Delle Monete was credited to "Conte Don Gianrinaldo Carli-Rubbi". In this name, conte is the Italian form of "count", don is an honorific derived from the Latin dominus ("lord, master"), "Gian" is the most common Italian diminutive for Giovanni, and his surname has been hyphenated with his wife's. His Degli Anfiteatri was credited to "Commendatore Conte Don Gianrinaldo Carli", where commendatore is the Italian form of "commander", from his knightly honors. He signed his name in Latin as "Johannes Rinaldus Comes Carlius". In early English sources, his name also appears as "Giovanni Rinaldo, Count of Carli", and "Giovanni Rinaldo, Count of Carli-Rubbi".

== Life ==
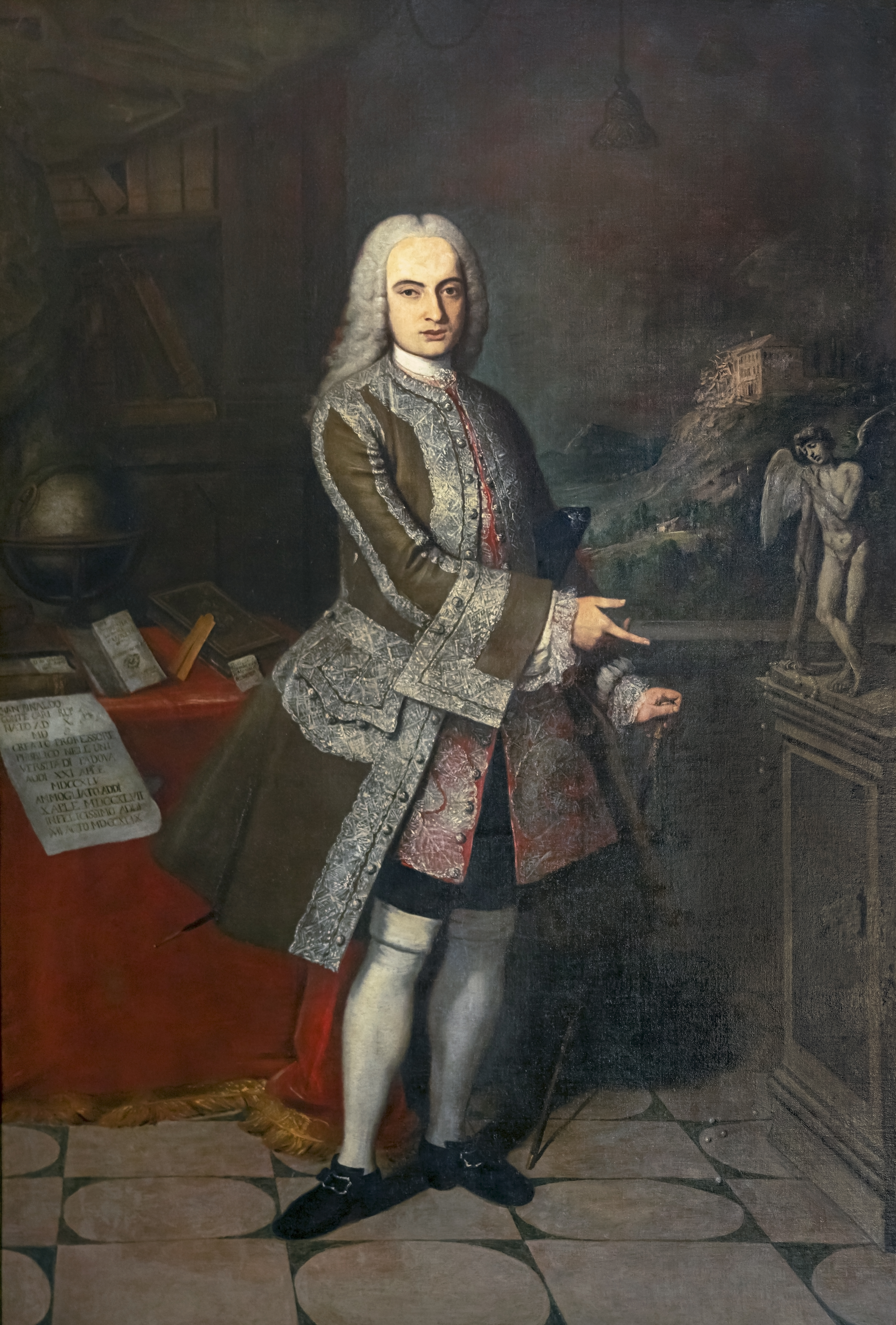
Gian Rinaldo Carli by Bartolomeo Nazari

Giovanni Rinaldo Carli was born at Capo d'Istria in the Republic of Venice (now Koper in Slovenia) on 11 April 1720, the eldest child of Count Rinaldo Carli and Cecilia Imberti.

He distinguished himself as a student and young scholar. In 1744, at the age of 24, he was appointed by the Venetian Senate to the University of Padua's newly established professorship of astronomy and navigation. At the same time, he was entrusted with superintendence over the Venetian marine. During these years he was part of a major dispute in Italian academia over the existence of sorcerers, with the vast majority of the academics siding with the Girolamo Tartarotti against the Marquis of Maffei and Count Carli's sharp scepticism. He filled his offices ably for seven years before resigning them to study economics and history. His works on economics attracted the attention of Leopold of Tuscany, afterwards emperor, who placed him at the head of his economics council and board of public instruction in 1765. In 1769, he became privy councillor and, in 1771, president of a new council of finances. In his old age, he was relieved of the duties of these offices while continuing to receive their income. During his leisure, he produced works on Italian history and other topics.

Count Carli died of illness at Cusano in Milan on 22 February 1795.

== Works ==
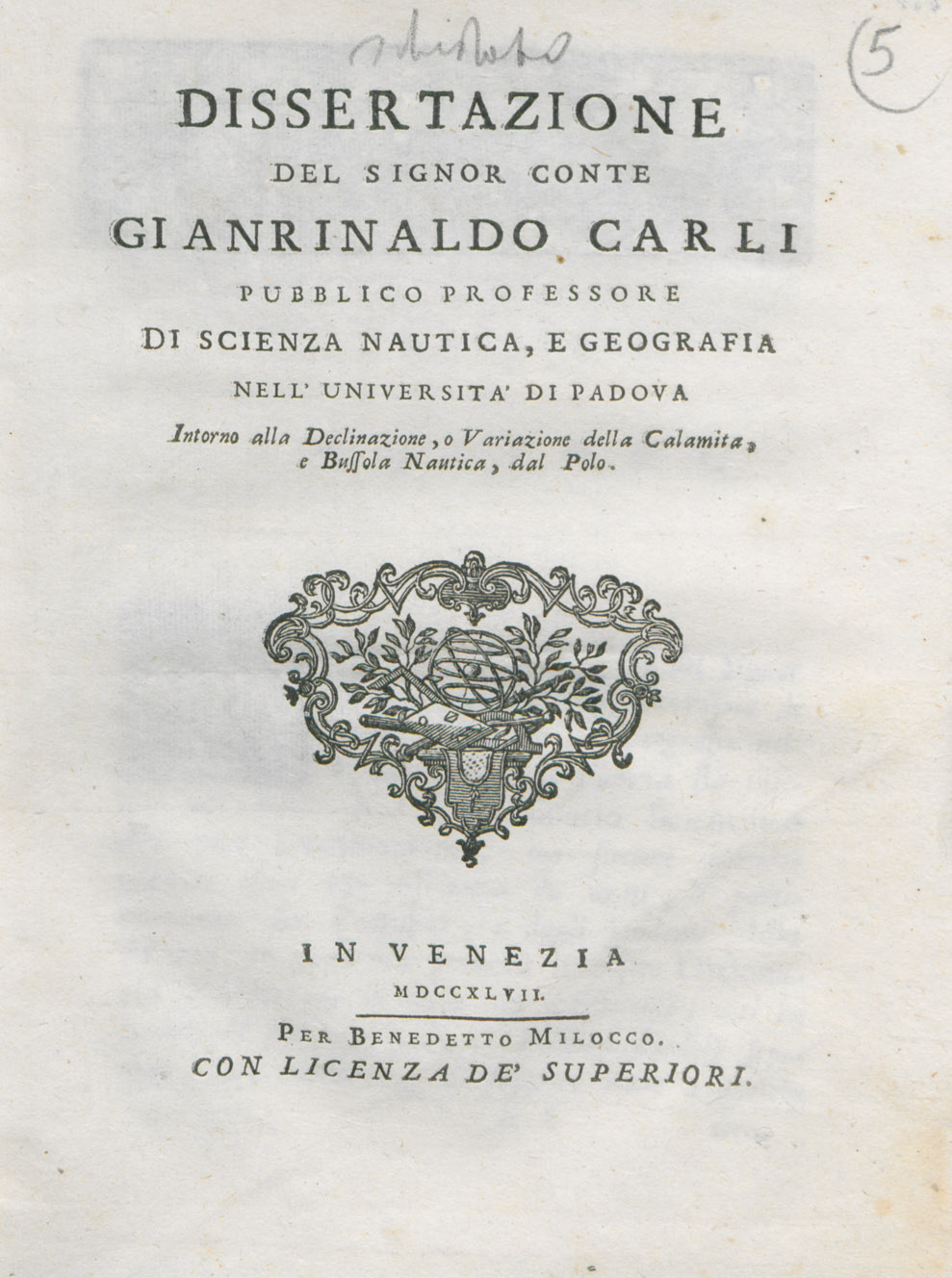
Dissertazione intorno alla declinazione o variazione della calamita e bussola nautica dal polo, 1747

His principal economic works are his On Money; his 1759 Ragionamento..., in which he argued that the balance of trade between two nations cannot be looked at in isolation as both may gain from their reciprocal transactions; and his 1771 On Free Trade in Grain, which argues that free trade in grain—as adopted by Great Britain following its later repeal of its Corn Laws—is not always advisable. His principal historical work was his Italian Antiquities, in which the literature and arts of his country are ably discussed. Other works of note were his The Free Man, a rebuttal of Rousseau's Social Contract; an attack upon Abbe Tartarotti's assertion of the existence of magicians; his Observations on Ancient and Modern Music; and several poems. A collected edition of his works was published in 18 volumes at Milan from 1784 to 1794; it does not include his American Letters.

- Carli, Giovanni Rinaldo (1745), Della Spedizione degli Argonauti in Colco, Venice: Giambattista Recurti. (in Italian)
- Carli, Gian Rinaldo (1747). Dissertazione intorno alla declinazione o variazione della calamita e bussola nautica dal polo. Benedetto Milocco.
- Carli-Rubbi, Giovanni Rinaldo (1750), Relazione delle Scoperte Fatte nell'Anfiteatro di Pola (in Italian), Venice: Giambatista Pasquali
- Carli-Rubbi, Giovanni Rinaldo (1754), Delle Monete e dell'Instituzione delle Zecche d'Italia dell'Antico, e Presente Sistema d'Esse: e del Loro Intrinseco Valore, e Rapporto con la Presente Moneta dalla Decadenza dell'Impero sino al Secolo XVII, Vol. I, The Hague. (in Italian)
- Carli-Rubbi, Giovanni Rinaldo (1757), Delle Monete..., Vol. II (in Italian), Pisa: Giovan Paolo Giovannelli & Co.
- Carli, Gian Rinaldo (1785). Opere. 9. Monistero di s. Ambrogio Maggiore.
- Carli, Gian Rinaldo (1785). Opere. 10. Monistero di s. Ambrogio Maggiore.
- Carli, Gian Rinaldo (1785). Opere. 19. Monistero di s. Ambrogio Maggiore.
- Carli, Gian Rinaldo (1785). Lettere americane. Parte prima. Monistero di s. Ambrogio Maggiore.
- Carli, Gian Rinaldo (1785). Lettere americane. Parte seconda. Monistero di s. Ambrogio Maggiore.
- Carli, Gian Rinaldo (1786). Lettere americane. Parte terza. Monistero di s. Ambrogio Maggiore.
- Carli, Gian Rinaldo (1786). Lettere americane. Parte quarta. Monistero di s. Ambrogio Maggiore.
- Carli-Rubbi, Giovanni Rinaldo (1760), Delle Monete..., Vol. III (in Italian), Lucca: Jacopo Giusii
- Carli, Giovanni Rinaldo (1788), Delle Antichitá Italiche, Pt. I, Milan: Monastery of Sant'Ambrogio Maggiore. (in Italian) & (in Latin)
- Carli, Giovanni Rinaldo (1788), Degli Anfiteatri e Particolarmente del Flavio di Roma di quello d'Italica nella Spagna e di quello di Pola nell'Istria, Milan: Monastery of Sant'Ambrogio Maggiore, which forms Part II of the Delle Antichità Italiche. (in Italian) & (in Latin)
- Carli, Giovanni Rinaldo (1789), Delle Antichita' Italiche, Pt. III (in Italian), Milan: Monastery of Sant'Ambrogio Maggiore & (in Latin)
- Carli, Giovanni Rinaldo (1790), Delle Antichitá Italiche, Pt. IV, con Due Appendici di Documenti (in Italian), Milan: Monastery of Sant'Ambrogio Maggiore & (in Latin)
- Carli, Giovanni Rinaldo (1791), Appendici di Documenti Spettanti alla Parte Quarta delle Antichità Italiche, Milan: Monastery of Sant'Ambrogio Maggiore, sometimes called Vol. V of the Delle Antichità Italiche. (in Italian) & (in Latin)

== Sources ==
- George Ripley; Charles A. Dana, eds. (1873), "Giovanni Rinaldo Carli", The American Cyclopaedia, New York: D. Appleton & Co..
- Baynes, T. S., ed. (1878). "Giovanni Rinaldo, Count of Carli" . Encyclopædia Britannica. Vol. 5 (9th ed.). New York: Charles Scribner's Sons. pp. 107–8.
- Chisholm, Hugh, ed. (1911). "Carli-Rubbi, Giovanni Rinaldo, Count of" . Encyclopædia Britannica. Vol. 5 (11th ed.). Cambridge University Press. p. 339.
- Apih, Elio (1977), "Gian Rinaldo Carli", in Raffaele Romanelli (ed.), Dizionario Biografico degli Italiani, Vol. XX, Treccani. (in Italian)
- Peter Hainsworth; David Robey, eds. (2002), "Gianrinaldo Carli", The Oxford Companion to Italian Literature, Oxford: Oxford University Press.
- Bossi, Luigi (1797), Elogio Storico del Conte Commendatore Gian-Rinaldo Carli (in Italian), Venice: Carlo Palese
