= Bipolaron (physics) =

Quasiparticle

In physics, a bipolaron is a type of quasiparticle consisting of two polarons bound together.

An electron in a material may cause a distortion in the underlying lattice. The combination of electron and distortion (which may also be understood as a cloud of phonons) is known as a polaron (in part because the interaction between electron and lattice is via a polarization). When two polarons are close together, they can lower their energy by sharing the same distortions, which leads to an effective attraction between the polarons. This attraction is opposed by the Coulomb interaction between the electrons. If the attractive interaction is sufficiently large, then it leads to a bound bipolaron. A large bipolaron extends over multiple unit cells in the crystal lattice. Small bipolarons are localized within a single unit cell, and typically form a singlet state to satisfy the Pauli exclusion principle.

If many bipolarons form without coming too close, they might be able to form a Bose–Einstein condensate. This has led to a suggestion that bipolarons could be a possible mechanism for high-temperature superconductivity. For example, they can lead to a very direct interpretation of the isotope effect.

Recently, bipolarons were predicted theoretically in a Bose-Einstein condensate. Two polarons interchange sound waves and they attract to each other, forming a bound-state when the strength coupling between the single polarons and the condensate is strong in comparison with the interactions of the host gas.
