= Polaron =

Quasiparticle in condensed matter physics

A polaron is a quasiparticle used in condensed matter physics to understand the interactions between electrons and atoms in a solid material. The polaron concept was proposed by Lev Landau in 1933 and Solomon Pekar in 1946 to describe an electron moving in a dielectric crystal where the atoms displace from their equilibrium positions to effectively screen the charge of an electron, known as a phonon cloud. This lowers the electron mobility and increases the electron's effective mass.

The general concept of a polaron has been extended to describe other interactions between the electrons and ions in metals that result in a bound state, or a lowering of energy compared to the non-interacting system. Major theoretical work has focused on solving Fröhlich and Holstein Hamiltonians. This is still an active field of research to find exact numerical solutions to the case of one or two electrons in a large crystal lattice, and to study the case of many interacting electrons.

Experimentally, polarons are important to the understanding of a wide variety of materials. The electron mobility in semiconductors can be greatly decreased by the formation of polarons. Organic semiconductors are also sensitive to polaronic effects, which is particularly relevant in the design of organic solar cells that effectively transport charge. Polarons are also important for interpreting the optical conductivity of these types of materials.

The polaron, a fermionic quasiparticle, should not be confused with the polariton, a bosonic quasiparticle analogous to a hybridized state between a photon and an optical phonon.

== Theory ==
The energy spectrum of an electron moving in a periodical potential of a rigid crystal lattice is called the Bloch spectrum, which consists of allowed bands and forbidden bands. An electron with energy inside an allowed band moves as a free electron but has an effective mass that differs from the electron mass in vacuum. However, a crystal lattice is deformable and displacements of atoms (ions) from their equilibrium positions are described in terms of phonons. Electrons interact with these displacements, and this interaction is known as electron-phonon coupling. One possible scenario was proposed in the seminal 1933 paper by Lev Landau, which includes the production of a lattice defect such as an F-center and a trapping of the electron by this defect. A different scenario was proposed by Solomon Pekar that envisions dressing the electron with lattice polarization (a cloud of virtual polar phonons). Such an electron with the accompanying deformation moves freely across the crystal, but with increased effective mass. Pekar coined for this charge carrier the term polaron.

Landau and Pekar constructed the basis of polaron theory. A charge placed in a polarizable medium will be screened. Dielectric theory describes the phenomenon by the induction of a polarization around the charge carrier. The induced polarization will follow the charge carrier when it is moving through the medium. The carrier together with the induced polarization is considered as one entity, which is called a polaron (see Fig. 1).

While polaron theory was originally developed for electrons, there is no fundamental reason why it could not be any other charged particle interacting with phonons. Indeed, other charged particles such as (electron) holes and ions generally follow the polaron theory. For example, the proton polaron was identified experimentally in 2017 and on ceramic electrolytes after its existence was hypothesized by A.L. Samgin.

Fig. 1: Artist view of a polaron. A conduction electron in an ionic crystal or a polar semiconductor repels the negative ions and attracts the positive ions. A self-induced potential arises, which acts back on the electron and modifies its physical properties.

Table 1: Fröhlich coupling constants
Material	α	Material	α
InSb	0.023	KI	2.5
InAs	0.052	TlBr	2.55
GaAs	0.068	KBr	3.05
GaP	0.20	RbI	3.16
CdTe	0.29	Bi_{12}SiO_{20}	3.18
ZnSe	0.43	CdF_{2}	3.2
CdS	0.53	KCl	3.44
AgBr	1.53	CsI	3.67
AgCl	1.84	SrTiO_{3}	3.77
α-Al_{2}O_{3}	2.40	RbCl	3.81

Usually, in covalent semiconductors the coupling of electrons with lattice deformation is weak and polarons do not form. In polar semiconductors the electrostatic interaction with induced polarization is strong and polarons are formed at low temperature, provided that their concentration is not large and the screening is not efficient. Another class of materials in which polarons are observed is molecular crystals, where the interaction with molecular vibrations may be strong. In the case of polar semiconductors, the interaction with polar phonons is described by the Fröhlich Hamiltonian. On the other hand, the interaction of electrons with molecular phonons is described by the Holstein Hamiltonian. Usually, the models describing polarons may be divided into two classes. The first class represents continuum models where the discreteness of the crystal lattice is neglected. In that case, polarons are weakly coupled or strongly coupled depending on whether the polaron binding energy is small or large compared to the phonon frequency. The second class of systems commonly considered are lattice models of polarons. In this case, there may be small or large polarons, depending on the relative size of the polaron radius to the lattice constant a.

=== Fröhlich Hamiltonian ===
A conduction electron in an ionic crystal or a polar semiconductor is the prototype of a polaron. Herbert Fröhlich proposed a model Hamiltonian for this polaron through which its dynamics are treated quantum mechanically. The strength of electron-phonon interaction is determined by the dimensionless coupling constant $\alpha = (e^2 / \kappa)(m / 2 \hbar^3\omega)^{1/2}$. Here $m$ is electron mass, $\omega$ is the phonon frequency and $\kappa^{-1} = {\epsilon}_{\infin}^{-1} - {\epsilon}_{0}^{-1}$, ${\epsilon}_{0}$, ${\epsilon}_{\infin}$ are static and high frequency dielectric constants. In table 1 the Fröhlich coupling constant is given for a few solids. The Fröhlich Hamiltonian for a single electron in a crystal using second quantization notation is:

$$H_{\rm e} = \sum_{k,s} \xi(k,s) c_{k,s}^\dagger c_{k,s}$$

$$H_{\rm ph} = \sum_{q,v} \omega_{q,v} a_{q,v}^\dagger a_{q,v}$$

$$H_{\rm e-ph} = \frac 1 {\sqrt{2N} } \sum_{k,s,q,v} \gamma(\alpha , q , k , v ) \omega_{qv} ( c_{k ,s}^\dagger c_{k-q , s} a_{q,v} + c_{k-q ,s}^\dagger c_{k , s} a^\dagger_{q,v}  )$$

The exact form of γ depends on the material and the type of phonon being used in the model. In the case of a single polar mode

$\gamma(q) = i\hbar\omega\left(\frac{4\pi\alpha}{V_0}\left(\frac{\hbar}{m\omega}\right)^{1/2}\right)^{1/2}\frac{1}{q}$,

here $V_0$ is the volume of the unit cell. In the case of molecular crystal γ is usually momentum independent constant. A detailed advanced discussion of the variations of the Fröhlich Hamiltonian can be found in J. T. Devreese and A. S. Alexandrov. The terms Fröhlich polaron and large polaron are sometimes used synonymously since the Fröhlich Hamiltonian includes the continuum approximation and long range forces. There is no known exact solution for the Fröhlich Hamiltonian with longitudinal optical (LO) phonons and linear $\gamma$ (the most commonly considered variant of the Fröhlich polaron) despite extensive investigations.

Despite the lack of an exact solution, some approximations of the polaron properties are known.

The physical properties of a polaron differ from those of a band-carrier. A polaron is characterized by its self-energy $\Delta E$, an effective mass $m^*$ and by its characteristic response to external electric and magnetic fields (e. g. dc mobility and optical absorption coefficient).

When the coupling is weak ($\alpha$ small), the self-energy of the polaron can be approximated as:

$$\frac{\Delta E}{\hbar\omega } \approx -\alpha -0.015919622\alpha^2, \qquad \qquad \qquad (1)\,$$

and the polaron mass $m*$, which can be measured by cyclotron resonance experiments, is larger than the band mass $m$ of the charge carrier without self-induced polarization:

$$\frac{m^*}{m} \approx 1+\frac{\alpha}{6}+0.0236\alpha^2. \qquad \qquad \qquad (2)$$

When the coupling is strong (α large), a variational approach due to Landau and Pekar indicates that the self-energy is proportional to α² and the polaron mass scales as α⁴. The Landau–Pekar variational calculation yields an upper bound to the polaron self-energy $E < -C_{PL} \alpha^2$, valid for all α, where $C_{PL}$ is a constant determined by solving an integro-differential equation. It was an open question for many years whether this expression was asymptotically exact as α tends to infinity. Finally, Monroe D. Donsker and S. R. Srinivasa Varadhan, applying large deviation theory to the path integral formulation for the self-energy, showed the large α exactitude of this Landau–Pekar formula. Later, Elliot H. Lieb and Lawrence E. Thomas gave a shorter proof using more conventional methods, and with explicit bounds on the lower order corrections to the Landau–Pekar formula.

Richard Feynman introduced the variational principle for path integrals to study the polaron. He simulated the interaction between the electron and the polarization modes by a harmonic interaction between a hypothetical particle and the electron. The analysis of an exactly solvable ("symmetrical") 1D-polaron model, Monte Carlo schemes and other numerical schemes demonstrate the remarkable accuracy of Feynman's path-integral approach to the polaron ground-state energy. Experimentally more directly accessible properties of the polaron, such as its mobility and optical absorption, have been investigated subsequently.

In the strong coupling limit, $\alpha \gg 1$, the spectrum of excited states of a polaron begins with polaron-phonon bound states with energies less than $\hbar\omega_0$, where $\omega_0$ is the frequency of optical phonons.

In the lattice models the main parameter is the polaron binding energy: $E_p = \frac{1}{2N}\sum_{q}|\gamma(q)|^{2}/\hbar\omega$, here summation is taken over the Brillouin zone. Note that this binding energy is purely adiabatic, i.e. does not depend on the ionic masses. For polar crystals the value of the polaron binding energy is strictly determined by the dielectric constants $\epsilon_0$,$\epsilon_\infin$, and is of the order of 0.3-0.8 eV. If polaron binding energy $E_p$ is smaller than the hopping integral t the large polaron is formed for some type of electron-phonon interactions. In the case when $E_p > t$ the small polaron is formed. There are two limiting cases in the lattice polaron theory. In the physically important adiabatic limit $t\gg\hbar\omega$ all terms which involve ionic masses are cancelled and formation of polaron is described by nonlinear Schrödinger equation with nonadiabatic correction describing phonon frequency renormalization and polaron tunneling. In the opposite limit $t\ll\hbar\omega$ the theory represents the expansion in $t/\hbar\omega$.

== Optical absorption ==
The expression for the magnetooptical absorption of a polaron is:

$$\Gamma(\Omega) \propto -\frac{\operatorname{Im} \Sigma(\Omega)}{\left[\Omega-\omega_{\mathrm{c}}-\operatorname{Re} \Sigma(\Omega)\right]^2 + \left[\operatorname{Im}\Sigma(\Omega)\right]^2}. \qquad\qquad\qquad (3)$$

Here, $\omega_c$ is the cyclotron frequency for a rigid-band electron. The magnetooptical absorption Γ(Ω) at the frequency Ω takes the form Σ(Ω) is the so-called "memory function", which describes the dynamics of the polaron. Σ(Ω) depends also on α, β (β$=1/kT$, where $k$ is the Boltzmann constant and $T$ is the temperature) and $\omega_{c}$.

In the absence of an external magnetic field ($\omega_{c}=0$) the optical absorption spectrum (3) of the polaron at weak coupling is determined by the absorption of radiation energy, which is reemitted in the form of LO phonons. At larger coupling, $\alpha \ge 5.9$, the polaron can undergo transitions toward a relatively stable internal excited state called the "relaxed excited state" (RES) (see Fig. 2). The RES peak in the spectrum also has a phonon sideband, which is related to a Franck–Condon-type transition.

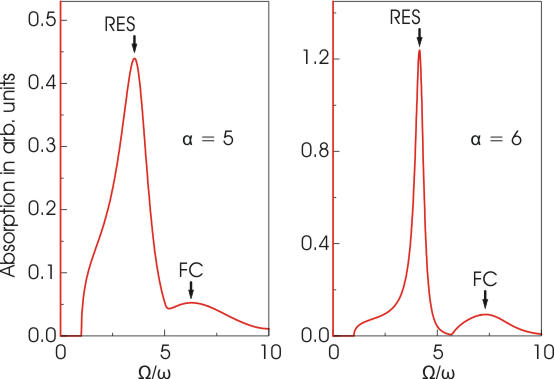
Fig.2. Optical absorption of a polaron at $\alpha = 5$ and 6. The RES peak is very intense compared with the Franck–Condon (FC) peak.

A comparison of the DSG results with the optical conductivity spectra given by approximation-free numerical and approximate analytical approaches is given in ref.

Calculations of the optical conductivity for the Fröhlich polaron performed within the Diagrammatic Quantum Monte Carlo method, see Fig. 3, fully confirm the results of the path-integral variational approach at $\alpha \lesssim 3.$ In the intermediate coupling regime $3<\alpha <6,$ the low-energy behavior and the position of the maximum of the optical conductivity spectrum of ref. follow well the prediction of Devreese. There are the following qualitative differences between the two approaches in the intermediate and strong coupling regime: in ref., the dominant peak broadens and the second peak does not develop, giving instead rise to a flat shoulder in the optical conductivity spectrum at $\alpha =6$. This behavior can be attributed to the optical processes with participation of two or more phonons. The nature of the excited states of a polaron needs further study.

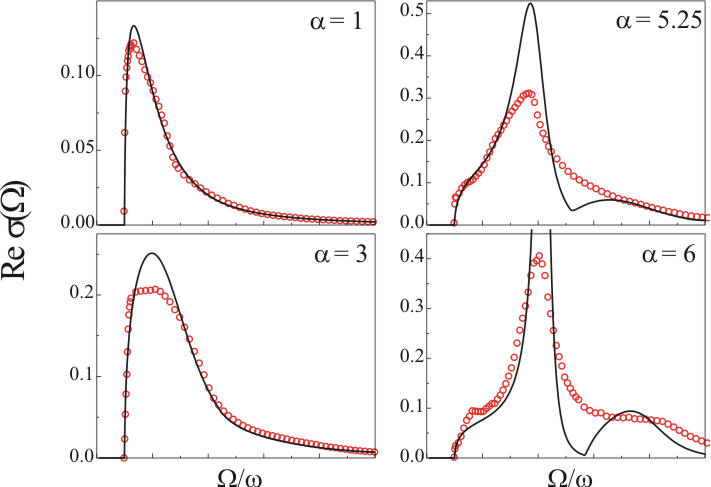
Fig. 3: Optical conductivity spectra calculated within the Diagrammatic Quantum Monte Carlo method (open circles) compared to the DSG calculations (solid lines).

The application of a sufficiently strong external magnetic field allows one to satisfy the resonance condition $\Omega =\omega_{\mathrm{c}} + \operatorname{Re} \Sigma (\Omega )$, which {(for $\omega_c < \omega$)} determines the polaron cyclotron resonance frequency. From this condition also the polaron cyclotron mass can be derived. Using the most accurate theoretical polaron models to evaluate $\Sigma (\Omega )$, the experimental cyclotron data can be well accounted for.

Evidence for the polaron character of charge carriers in AgBr and AgCl was obtained through high-precision cyclotron resonance experiments in external magnetic fields up to 16 T. The all-coupling magneto-absorption calculated in ref., leads to the best quantitative agreement between theory and experiment for AgBr and AgCl. This quantitative interpretation of the cyclotron resonance experiment in AgBr and AgCl by the theory of Peeters provided a clear demonstration of Fröhlich polaron features in solids.

Experimental data on the magnetopolaron effect, obtained using far-infrared photoconductivity techniques, have been applied to study the energy spectrum of shallow donors in polar semiconductor layers of CdTe.

The polaron effect well above the LO phonon energy was studied through cyclotron resonance measurements, e. g., in II–VI semiconductors, observed in ultra-high magnetic fields. The resonant polaron effect manifests itself when the cyclotron frequency approaches the LO phonon energy in sufficiently high magnetic fields.

In the lattice models the optical conductivity is given by the formula:

$$\sigma(\Omega) = n_pe^2a^2 \frac{\pi^{\frac{1}{2}}t^2\left(1-e^{\frac{\hbar\Omega}{k_{\rm B}T}}\right)}{2\hbar^2\Omega(E_ak_{\rm B}T)^{1/2}}\exp\left(-\frac{(\hbar\Omega-4E_a)^2}{16E_ak_{\rm B}T}\right)$$

Here $E_a$ is the activation energy of polaron, which is of the order of polaron binding energy $E_p$. This formula was derived and extensively discussed in and was tested experimentally for example in photodoped parent compounds of high temperature superconductors.

== In two dimensions and in quasi-2D structures ==
The great interest in the study of the two-dimensional electron gas (2DEG) has also resulted in many investigations on the properties of polarons in two dimensions. A simple model for the 2D polaron system consists of an electron confined to a plane, interacting via the Fröhlich interaction with the LO phonons of a 3D surrounding medium. The self-energy and the mass of such a 2D polaron are no longer described by the expressions valid in 3D; for weak coupling they can be approximated as:

$$\frac{\Delta E}{\hbar \omega} \approx -\frac{\pi}{2}\alpha\ - 0.06397\alpha^2;  \qquad \qquad \qquad (4)\,$$

$$\frac{m^*}{m} \approx 1+\frac{\pi}{8}\alpha\ + 0.1272348\alpha^2. \qquad \qquad \qquad (5)\,$$

It has been shown that simple scaling relations exist, connecting the physical properties of polarons in 2D with those in 3D. An example of such a scaling relation is:

$$\frac{m^{*}_{\rm 2D}(\alpha)}{m_{\rm 2D}}=\frac{m^{*}_{\rm 3D}(\frac{3}{4}\pi\alpha)}{m_{\rm 3D}}, \qquad \qquad \qquad (6)\,$$

where $m_\mathrm{2D}^*$ ($m_\mathrm{3D}^*$) and $m_\mathrm{2D}$ ($m_\mathrm{3D}$) are, respectively, the polaron and the electron-band masses in 2D (3D).

The effect of the confinement of a Fröhlich polaron is to enhance the effective polaron coupling. However, many-particle effects tend to counterbalance this effect because of screening.

Also in 2D systems cyclotron resonance is a convenient tool to study polaron effects. Although several other effects have to be taken into account (nonparabolicity of the electron bands, many-body effects, the nature of the confining potential, etc.), the polaron effect is clearly revealed in the cyclotron mass. An interesting 2D system consists of electrons on films of liquid He. In this system the electrons couple to the ripplons of the liquid He, forming "ripplopolarons". The effective coupling can be relatively large and, for some values of the parameters, self-trapping can result. The acoustic nature of the ripplon dispersion at long wavelengths is a key aspect of the trapping.

For GaAs/Al_{x}Ga_{1−x}As quantum wells and superlattices, the polaron effect is found to decrease the energy of the shallow donor states at low magnetic fields and leads to a resonant splitting of the energies at high magnetic fields. The energy spectra of such polaronic systems as shallow donors ("bound polarons"), e. g., the D_{0} and D^{−} centres, constitute the most complete and detailed polaron spectroscopy realised in the literature.

In GaAs/AlAs quantum wells with sufficiently high electron density, anticrossing of the cyclotron-resonance spectra has been observed near the GaAs transverse optical (TO) phonon frequency rather than near the GaAs LO-phonon frequency. This anticrossing near the TO-phonon frequency was explained in the framework of the polaron theory.

Besides optical properties, many other physical properties of polarons have been studied, including the possibility of self-trapping, polaron transport, magnetophonon resonance, etc.

== Extensions ==
Significant are also the extensions of the polaron concept: acoustic polaron, piezoelectric polaron, electronic polaron, bound polaron, trapped polaron, spin polaron, molecular polaron, solvated polarons, polaronic exciton, Jahn-Teller polaron, small polaron, bipolarons and many-polaron systems. These extensions of the concept are invoked, e. g., to study the properties of conjugated polymers, colossal magnetoresistance perovskites, high-$T_{c}$ superconductors, layered MgB_{2} superconductors, fullerenes, quasi-1D conductors, semiconductor nanostructures.

The possibility that polarons and bipolarons play a role in high-$T_{c}$ superconductors has renewed interest in the physical properties of many-polaron systems and, in particular, in their optical properties. Theoretical treatments have been extended from one-polaron to many-polaron systems.

A new aspect of the polaron concept has been investigated for semiconductor nanostructures: the exciton-phonon states are not factorizable into an adiabatic product Ansatz, so that a non-adiabatic treatment is needed. The non-adiabaticity of the exciton-phonon systems leads to a strong enhancement of the phonon-assisted transition probabilities (as compared to those treated adiabatically) and to multiphonon optical spectra that are considerably different from the Franck–Condon progression even for small values of the electron-phonon coupling constant as is the case for typical semiconductor nanostructures.

In biophysics Davydov soliton is a propagating along the protein α-helix self-trapped amide I excitation that is a solution of the Davydov Hamiltonian. The mathematical techniques that are used to analyze Davydov's soliton are similar to some that have been developed in polaron theory. In this context the Davydov soliton corresponds to a polaron that is (i) large so the continuum limit approximation in justified, (ii) acoustic because the self-localization arises from interactions with acoustic modes of the lattice, and (iii) weakly coupled because the anharmonic energy is small compared with the phonon bandwidth.

It has been shown that the system of an impurity in a Bose–Einstein condensate is also a member of the polaron family. This allows the hitherto inaccessible strong coupling regime to be studied, since the interaction strengths can be externally tuned through the use of a Feshbach resonance. This was recently realized experimentally by two research groups. The existence of the polaron in a Bose–Einstein condensate was demonstrated for both attractive and repulsive interactions, including the strong coupling regime and dynamically observed.

== See also ==
- Exciton
- Sigurd Zienau
- TI-polaron
