= Helical Dirac fermion =

A Helical Dirac fermion is a charge carrier that behaves as a massless relativistic particle with its intrinsic spin locked to its translational momentum.
