= Andreas Friedrich Bauer =

German engineer

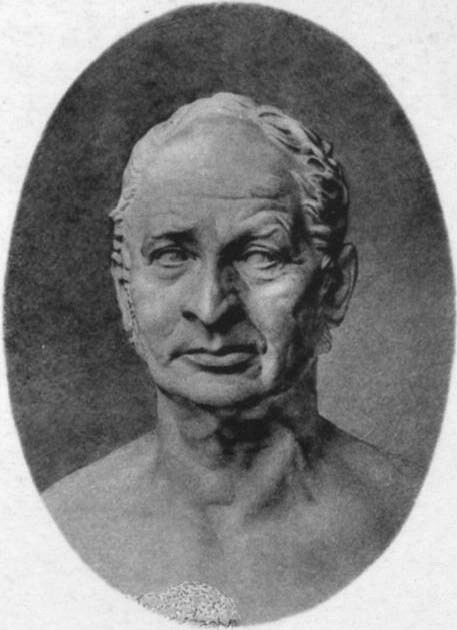
- Born: 18 August 1783; Stuttgart, Württemberg, Germany
- Died: 27 December 1860 (aged 77); Oberzell, Franconia
- Occupation: Engineer

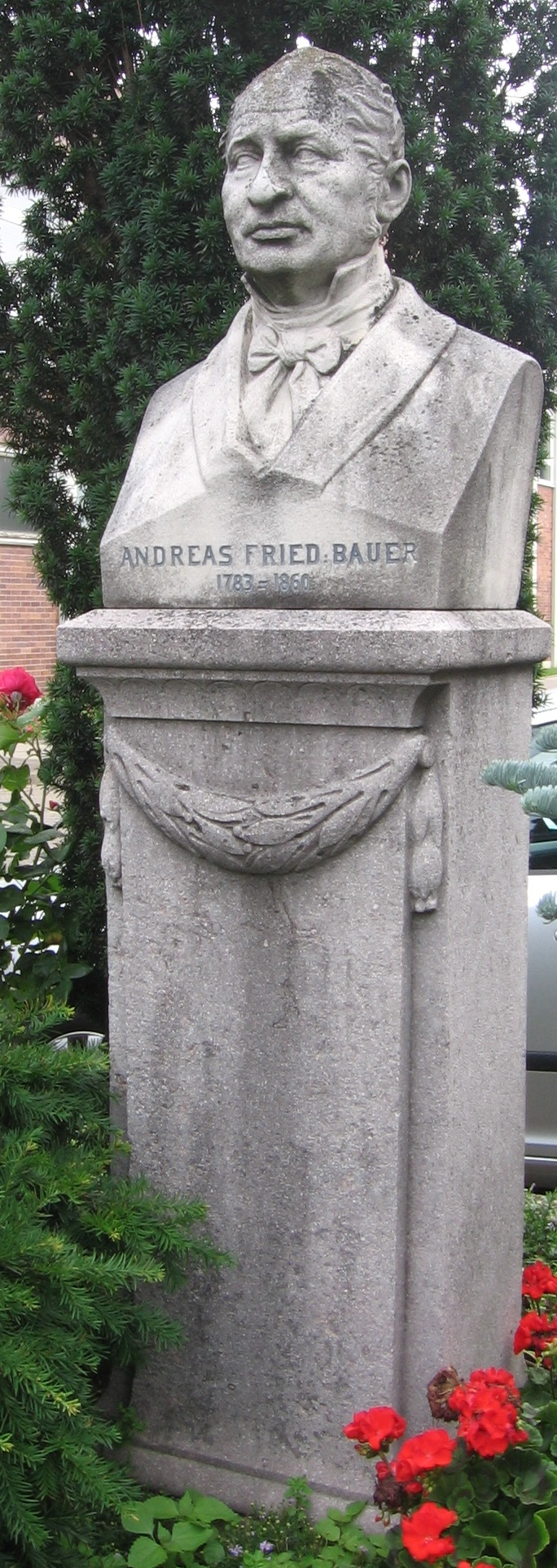
Andreas Friedrich Bauer monument in Würzburg

Andreas Friedrich Bauer (18 August 1783 – 27 December 1860) was a German engineer who developed the first functional steam-powered printing press with his colleague Friedrich Koenig, who had invented the technology and sold it to The Times in London in 1814.

== Life ==
Bauer studied mathematics and philosophy in Tübingen and earned his doctorate in his faculty before apprenticed to a mechanic in his hometown Stuttgart. In 1805, Bauer emigrated to Great Britain, where he met Friedrich Koenig in 1807. From 1815 onward, he was Koenig's employee and partner in England. Together, they developed, built, and improved, among other things, a high-speed printing press for the London Times.

In 1818, Bauer and Koenig moved back to Germany and Bauer joined Koenig in 1817 to found Koenig & Bauer at the Oberzell monastery near Würzburg. Bauer's grave is located in the cemetery of Oberzell Monastery.

== Printing capacity ==
The table lists the maximum number of pages which the various press designs of Koenig & Bauer could print per hour, compared to earlier hand-operated printing presses:

	Hand-operated presses		Steam-powered presses			
	Gutenberg-style ca. 1600	Stanhope ca. 1800	Koenig & Bauer 1812	Koenig & Bauer 1813	Koenig & Bauer 1814	Koenig & Bauer 1818
Impressions per hour	240	480	800	1100	2000	2400

== Sources ==
- Bolza, Hans (1967), "Friedrich Koenig und die Erfindung der Druckmaschine", Technikgeschichte, 34 (1): 79–89
- Wolf, Hans-Jürgen (1974), Geschichte der Druckpressen (1st ed.), Frankfurt/Main: Interprint
