= TI-polaron =

Elementary quasiparticle

A TI-polaron (translation-invariant polaron) is a type of elementary quasiparticle in solid-state physics. The ground state of TI-polaron is a delocalized state of electron-phonon system: the probabilities of electron's occurrence at any point of a space are similar. Both the electron density and the amplitudes of phonon modes (renormalized by an interaction with the electron) are delocalized. The concept of a polaron potential well (formed by local phonons) in which the electron is localized, i.e. self-trapped state is lacking. Accordingly, the induced polarization charge of the translation-invariant polaron is equal to zero.

The ground state energy of the translation-invariant polaron is lower than that of Pekar polaron and is E_{0} = -0.125720 α^{2} (for Pekar polaron E_{0} = -0.10851128 α^{2}), where α is electron-phonon coupling.

TI-polarons can create bound TI-bipolaron states, which play an important role in the theory of superconductivity.
