= Optical conductivity =

Property of a material

Optical conductivity is the property of a material which gives the relationship between the induced current density in the material and the magnitude of the inducing electric field for arbitrary frequencies. This linear response function is a generalization of the electrical conductivity, which is usually considered in the static limit, i.e., for time-independent or slowly varying electric fields.

While the static electrical conductivity is vanishingly small in insulators (such as diamond or porcelain), the optical conductivity always remains finite in some frequency intervals (above the optical gap in the case of insulators). The total optical weight can be inferred from sum rules. The optical conductivity is closely related to the dielectric function, the generalization of the dielectric constant to arbitrary frequencies.

== High frequency limit ==
In the simplest cases, this property can be considered as a complex valued scalar function of frequency only. This formulation applies in the limit of long wavelengths, coarse grained structure, and cubic material symmetry. In this approximation, the electric current density $\mathbf{J}$ (a three-dimensional vector), the scalar optical conductivity $\sigma$ and the electric field vector $\mathbf{E}$ are linked by the equation:

$\mathbf{J}(\omega) = \sigma(\omega) \mathbf{E}(\omega)$

For comparison, the permittivity $\varepsilon$ relates the electrical displacement to the electric field:

$\mathbf{D}(\omega) = \varepsilon(\omega) \mathbf{E}(\omega)$

In SI units, this implies the following connection between the two linear response functions:

$$\varepsilon(\omega) = 1 + \frac{i \sigma(\omega)}{\varepsilon_0 \omega}$$,

where $\varepsilon_0$ is the vacuum permittivity and $i$ denotes the imaginary unit.

== Measurement ==
The optical conductivity is most often measured in optical frequency ranges via the reflectivity of polished samples under normal incidence (in combination with a Kramers–Kronig analysis) or using variable incidence angles. For samples that can be prepared in thin slices, higher precision is obtainable using optical transmission experiments. To fully determine the electronic properties of the material of interest, such measurements are combined with other techniques that work in different frequency ranges, e.g., in the static limit or at microwave frequencies.
