= Hopfion =

Topological soliton

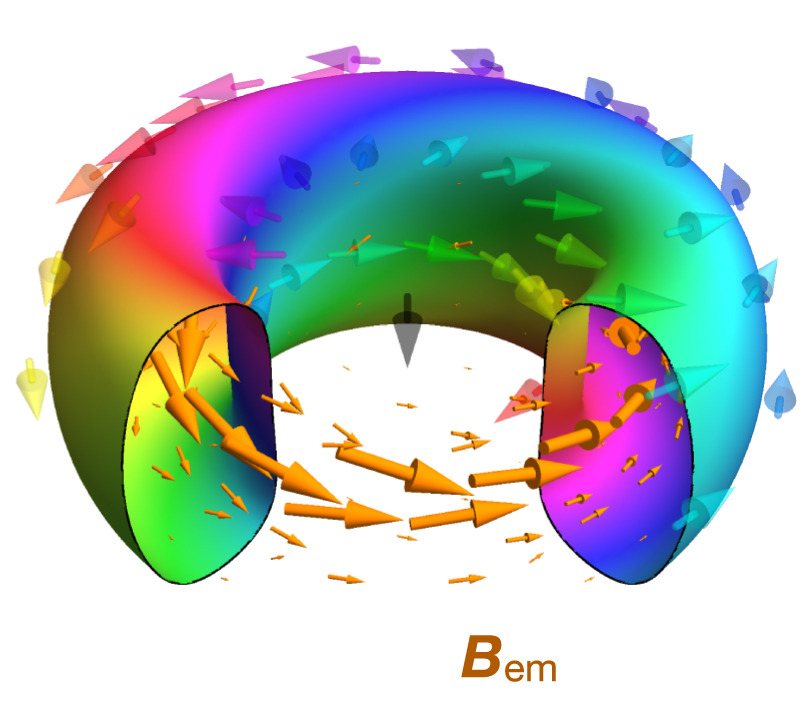
Model of magnetic hopfion in a solid. B_{em} is emergent magnetic field (orange arrows); in a hopfion, it does not align to the external magnetic field (black arrow).

A hopfion is a topological soliton. It is a stable three-dimensional localised configuration of a three-component field $\vec{n}=(n_x,n_y,n_z)$ of unit length with a knotted topological structure. They are the three-dimensional counterparts of 2D skyrmions, which exhibit similar topological properties in 2D. Hopfions are widely studied in many physical systems over the last half century.

The soliton is mobile and stable: i.e. it is protected from a decay by an energy barrier. It can be deformed but always conserves an integer Hopf topological invariant. It is named after the German mathematician, Heinz Hopf.

A model that supports hopfions was proposed as follows:

$H= (\partial {\bf n})^2 + (\epsilon_{ijk}{\bf n}\cdot\partial_i {\bf n}\times \partial_j{\bf n})^2$

The terms of higher-order derivatives are required to stabilize the hopfions.

Stable hopfions were predicted within various physical platforms, including Yang–Mills theory, superconductivity and magnetism.

== Experimental observation ==
Hopfions have been observed experimentally in chiral colloidal magnetic materials, in chiral liquid crystals, in Ir/Co/Pt multilayers using X-ray magnetic circular dichroism and in the polarization of free-space monochromatic light.

In chiral magnets, a helical-background variant of the hopfion has been theoretically predicted to occur within the spiral magnetic phase, where it was called a "heliknoton". In recent years, the concept of a "fractional hopfion" has also emerged where not all preimages of magnetisation have a nonzero linking.

== See also ==
- Skyrmion
- Hopf fibration
