= Phoniton =

A phoniton is a theoretical quasiparticle that emerges from the hybridization of a localized, long-lived phonon (a quantum of sound) with a matter excitation. It serves as a sound-based analogue of cavity quantum electrodynamics, where the phonon plays a role similar to that of a photon in coupling with a matter excitation to form a polariton.

The concept of phonitons was introduced in research conducted by Soykal et al. In their study, they explore the possibility of realizing these hybrid objects based on sound and matter. By investigating strained silicon systems, the authors identify low-lying donor transitions that can be driven solely by acoustic phonons at wavelengths suitable for constructing high-Q phonon cavities. The strongly coupled regime of the phonon-matter resonance is achieved, surpassing the thresholds of spontaneous phonon emission, phonon leakage, anharmonicity, and scattering. The proposed micropillar distributed Bragg reflector Si/Ge cavity demonstrates the feasibility of achieving high-Q factors and small mode volumes.

Phonitons offer exciting prospects in manipulating quantized vibrations in nanoscale mechanical systems and gaining deeper insights into the nature of sound and heat at the quantum level. phonitons can serve as fundamental components in constructing new macroscopic artificial quantum systems.

== See also ==
- Quasiparticle
- Cavity quantum electrodynamics
- Quantum mechanics
