= Leviton (quasiparticle) =

A leviton is a collective excitation of a single electron within a metal. It has been mostly studied in two-dimensional electron gases alongside quantum point contacts. The main feature is that the excitation produces an electron pulse without the creation of electron holes. The time-dependence of the pulse is described by a Lorentzian distribution created by a pulsed electric potential.

Levitons have also been described in graphene and were observed in graphene flakes in the quantum Hall regime.

The leviton is named after Leonid Levitov, who first predicted its existence in 1996.

== Literature ==
- Glattli, D. Christian; Roulleau, Preden S. (2017). "Levitons for electron quantum optics". physica status solidi (b). 254 (3) 1600650. arXiv:1610.04354. doi:10.1002/pssb.201600650.
