= Configuron =

A configuron is an elementary configurational excitation in an amorphous material which involves breaking of a chemical bond. Coined by scientists C.A. Angell and K.J. Rao, this concept often involves the breaking and reforming of a chemical bond.

These configurational excitations, or configurons, serve as a crucial aspect of understanding the dynamic behaviors of amorphous materials. Essentially, these are the fundamental building blocks that dictate the arrangements of atoms or molecules within these substances.

Understanding configurons can open avenues in various fields, such as materials science and electronics, by allowing more precise manipulation of amorphous materials' properties.

== See also ==
- Quasiparticle
- Amorphous solid
- Condensed matter physics
- Configuration interaction
