= Polymer substrate =

Polymers and plastics known as polymer substrates are used for banknotes and other everyday products. The banknote is more durable than paper, won't become soaked in liquids and is harder to counterfeit, though not impossible. Countries whose whole banknote production is in polymer are: Australia, Romania, Vietnam, United Kingdom and New Zealand. Other countries that have partial polymer and paper issue include Papua New Guinea, Samoa, Solomon Islands, Mexico, Zambia, Brunei, Malaysia, Singapore, Nigeria, Chile, and Nepal. The material is also used in commemorative notes in some other countries. The process of polymer substrate creation was developed by the Australia CSIRO. Countries like Bulgaria have issued a combination of paper and polymer as the 200 Lev banknote.
